= Battle of Pyzdry =

Battle of Pyzdry may refer to:

- Battle of Pyzdry (1331)
- Battle of Pyzdry (1863)
