= Słomowo, Września County =

Słomowo
- Village
- Location within Poland
- Coordinates: 52°21′N 17°33′E
- Country: Poland
- Voivodeship: Greater Poland
- County: Września
- Gmina: Września
- Population (2009): 280

Słomowo [swɔˈmɔvɔ] is a village in the administrative district of Gmina Września, within Września County, Greater Poland Voivodeship, in west-central Poland.
