= Nowa Wieś Królewska, Greater Poland Voivodeship =

Nowa Wieś Królewska
- Village
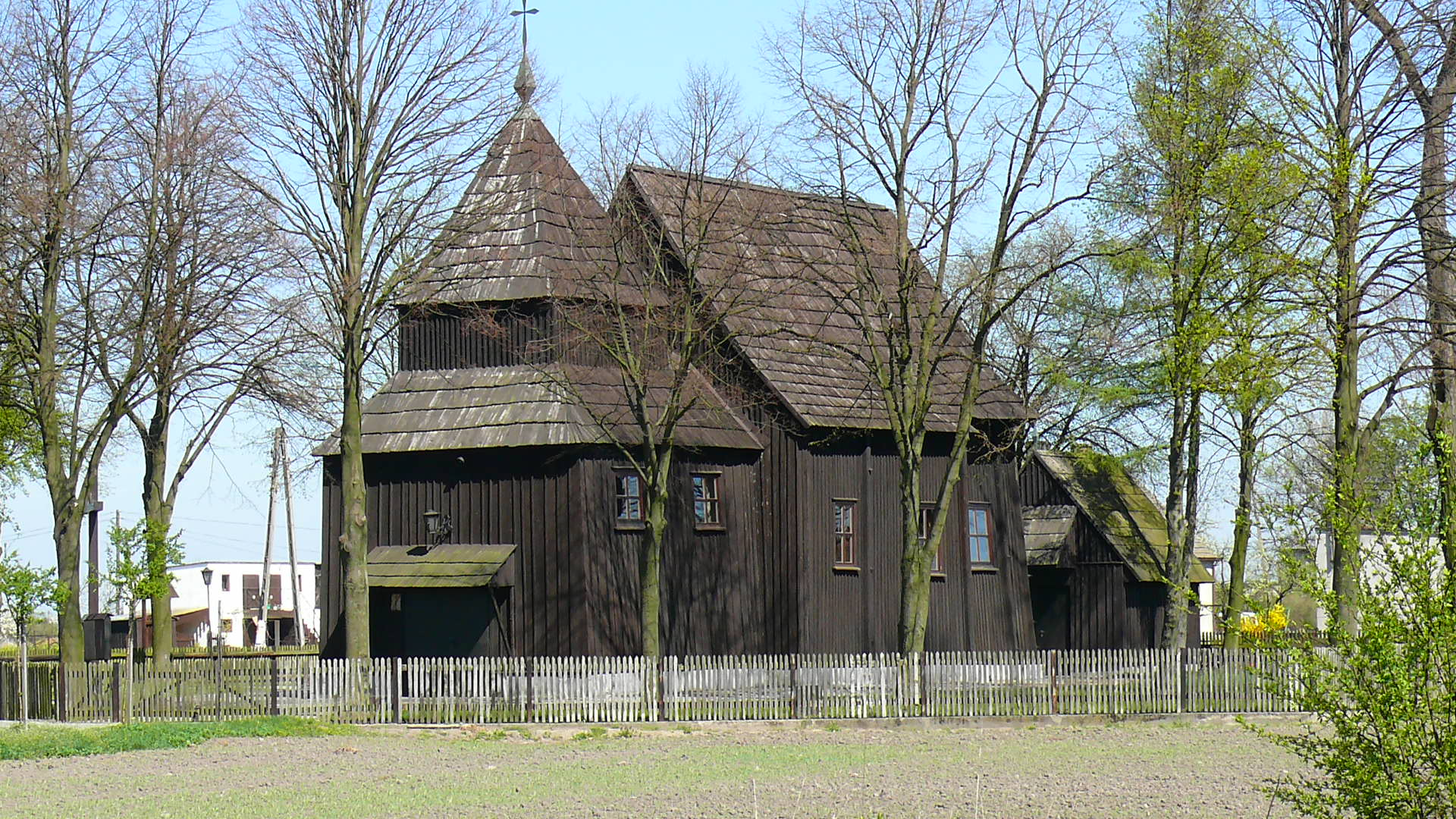
- Church of Saint Andrew

- Location within Poland
- Coordinates: 52°15′27″N 17°35′52″E
- Country: Poland
- Voivodeship: Greater Poland
- County: Września
- Gmina: Września

Population
  - Total: 340

Nowa Wieś Królewska [ˈnɔva ˈvjɛɕ kruˈlɛfska] is a village in the administrative district of Gmina Września, within Września County, Greater Poland Voivodeship, in west-central Poland.
