= Gulczewko =

- Village
- Location within Poland
- Coordinates: 52°22′41″N 17°33′50″E
- Country: Poland
- Voivodeship: Greater Poland
- County: Września
- Gmina: Września

Gulczewko [ɡulˈt͡ʂɛfkɔ] is a village in the administrative district of Gmina Września, within Września County, Greater Poland Voivodeship, in west-central Poland.
