= Nadarzyce =

Nadarzyce may refer to the following places in Poland:

- Nadarzyce, Września County (west-central Poland)
- Nadarzyce, Złotów County (west-central Poland)
