= Broniszewo, Września County =

Broniszewo
- Village
- Location within Poland
- Coordinates: 52°20′59″N 17°41′19″E
- Country: Poland
- Voivodeship: Greater Poland
- County: Września
- Gmina: Września

Broniszewo [brɔniˈʂɛvɔ] is a village in the administrative district of Gmina Września, within Września County, Greater Poland Voivodeship, in west-central Poland.
