= Żdżary, Września County =

Żdżary
- Settlement
- Location within Poland
- Coordinates: 52°8′N 17°46′E
- Country: Poland
- Voivodeship: Greater Poland
- County: Września
- Gmina: Pyzdry

Żdżary [ˈʐd͡ʐarɨ] is a settlement in the administrative district of Gmina Pyzdry, within Września County, Greater Poland Voivodeship, in west-central Poland.
