= Trzcianki, Greater Poland Voivodeship =

Trzcianki
- Village
- Location within Poland
- Coordinates: 52°09′08″N 17°43′57″E
- Country: Poland
- Voivodeship: Greater Poland
- County: Września
- Gmina: Pyzdry

Trzcianki [ˈtʂt͡ɕanki] is a village in the administrative district of Gmina Pyzdry, within Września County, Greater Poland Voivodeship, in west-central Poland.
