= Bierzglinek =

- Village
- Location within Poland
- Coordinates: 52°18′18″N 17°34′25″E
- Country: Poland
- Voivodeship: Greater Poland
- County: Września
- Gmina: Września
- Population: 960

Bierzglinek [bjɛʐˈɡlinɛk] is a village in the administrative district of Gmina Września, within Września County, Greater Poland Voivodeship, in west-central Poland.
