= Sokołówko =

- Settlement
- Location within Poland
- Coordinates: 52°21′44″N 17°33′59″E
- Country: Poland
- Voivodeship: Greater Poland
- County: Września
- Gmina: Września

Sokołówko [sɔkɔˈwufkɔ] is a settlement in the administrative district of Gmina Września, within Września County, Greater Poland Voivodeship, in west-central Poland.
