= Strzyżewo, Września County =

Strzyżewo
- Village
- Location within Poland
- Coordinates: 52°24′26″N 17°30′39″E
- Country: Poland
- Voivodeship: Greater Poland
- County: Września
- Gmina: Września

Strzyżewo [stʂɨˈʐɛvɔ] is a village in the administrative district of Gmina Września, within Września County, Greater Poland Voivodeship, in west-central Poland.
