= Królewiny =

- Settlement
- Location within Poland
- Coordinates: 52°09′26″N 17°45′03″E
- Country: Poland
- Voivodeship: Greater Poland
- County: Września
- Gmina: Pyzdry

Królewiny [krulɛˈvinɨ] is a settlement in the administrative district of Gmina Pyzdry, within Września County, Greater Poland Voivodeship, in west-central Poland.
