= Neryngowo =

- Village
- Location within Poland
- Coordinates: 52°16′44″N 17°37′20″E
- Country: Poland
- Voivodeship: Greater Poland
- County: Września
- Gmina: Września

Neryngowo [nɛrɨnˈɡɔvɔ] is a village in the administrative district of Gmina Września, within Września County, Greater Poland Voivodeship, in west-central Poland.
