= Kleparz, Greater Poland Voivodeship =

Kleparz
- Village
- Location within Poland
- Coordinates: 52°21′17″N 17°37′58″E
- Country: Poland
- Voivodeship: Greater Poland
- County: Września
- Gmina: Września

Kleparz [ˈklɛpaʂ] is a village in the administrative district of Gmina Września, within Września County, Greater Poland Voivodeship, in west-central Poland.
