= Gutowo Wielkie =

- Village
- Location within Poland
- Coordinates: 52°20′N 17°38′E
- Country: Poland
- Voivodeship: Greater Poland
- County: Września
- Gmina: Września

Gutowo Wielkie [ɡuˈtɔvɔ ˈvjɛlkʲɛ] is a village in the administrative district of Gmina Września, within Września County, Greater Poland Voivodeship, in west-central Poland.
