= Pietrzyków-Kolonia =

- Village
- Location within Poland
- Coordinates: 52°12′11.88″N 17°44′57.11″E
- Country: Poland
- Voivodeship: Greater Poland
- County: Września
- Gmina: Pyzdry

Pietrzyków-Kolonia [pjɛˈtʂɨkuf kɔˈlɔɲa] is a village in the administrative district of Gmina Pyzdry, within Września County, Greater Poland Voivodeship, in west-central Poland.
