= Marzenin, Greater Poland Voivodeship =

Marzenin
- Village
- Location within Poland
- Coordinates: 52°23′N 17°32′E
- Country: Poland
- Voivodeship: Greater Poland
- County: Września
- Gmina: Września
- Website: http://www.marzenin.pl/

Marzenin [maˈʐɛnin] is a village in the administrative district of Gmina Września, within Września County, Greater Poland Voivodeship, in west-central Poland.
