= Tarnowa, Września County =

Tarnowa
- Village
- Location within Poland
- Coordinates: 52°9′N 17°40′E
- Country: Poland
- Voivodeship: Greater Poland
- County: Września
- Gmina: Pyzdry

Tarnowa [tarˈnɔva] is a village in the administrative district of Gmina Pyzdry, within Września County, Greater Poland Voivodeship, in west-central Poland.
