= Stanisławowo, Września County =

Stanisławowo
- Village
- Location within Poland
- Coordinates: 52°23′N 17°42′E
- Country: Poland
- Voivodeship: Greater Poland
- County: Września
- Gmina: Września

Stanisławowo [staniswaˈvɔvɔ] is a village in the administrative district of Gmina Września, within Września County, Greater Poland Voivodeship, in west-central Poland.
