= Zamość, Września County =

Zamość
- Settlement
- Location within Poland
- Coordinates: 52°7′43″N 17°40′45″E
- Country: Poland
- Voivodeship: Greater Poland
- County: Września
- Gmina: Pyzdry

Zamość (Polish pronunciation: [ˈzamɔɕt͡ɕ]) is a settlement in the administrative district of Gmina Pyzdry, within Września County, Greater Poland Voivodeship, in west-central Poland.
