= Grzymysławice =

- Village
- Location within Poland
- Coordinates: 52°17′20″N 17°30′09″E
- Country: Poland
- Voivodeship: Greater Poland
- County: Września
- Gmina: Września

Grzymysławice [ɡʐɨmɨswaˈvit͡sɛ] is a village in the administrative district of Gmina Września, within Września County, Greater Poland Voivodeship, in west-central Poland.
