= Białobrzeg =

- Village
- Location within Poland
- Coordinates: 52°11′N 17°47′E
- Country: Poland
- Voivodeship: Greater Poland
- County: Września
- Gmina: Pyzdry

Białobrzeg [bjaˈwɔbʐɛk] is a village in the administrative district of Gmina Pyzdry, within Września County, Greater Poland Voivodeship, in west-central Poland.
