= Baraniec, Greater Poland Voivodeship =

Baraniec
- Settlement
- Location within Poland
- Coordinates: 52°7′29″N 17°42′47″E
- Country: Poland
- Voivodeship: Greater Poland
- County: Września
- Gmina: Pyzdry

Baraniec [baˈraɲɛt͡s] is a settlement in the administrative district of Gmina Pyzdry, within Września County, Greater Poland Voivodeship, in west-central Poland.
