= Gulczewo =

Gulczewo may refer to the following places:

- Gulczewo, Greater Poland Voivodeship (west-central Poland)
- Gulczewo, Kuyavian-Pomeranian Voivodeship (north-central Poland)
- Gulczewo, Wyszków County in Masovian Voivodeship (east-central Poland)
