= Sport in Września =

Sport in Września - there are several sports facilities in Września, Poland. It works football club MKS found in Victoria September 2011/2012 season in the fourth league southern Wielkopolska group and several other sports groups.

== Sports facilities ==
=== Skatepark ===
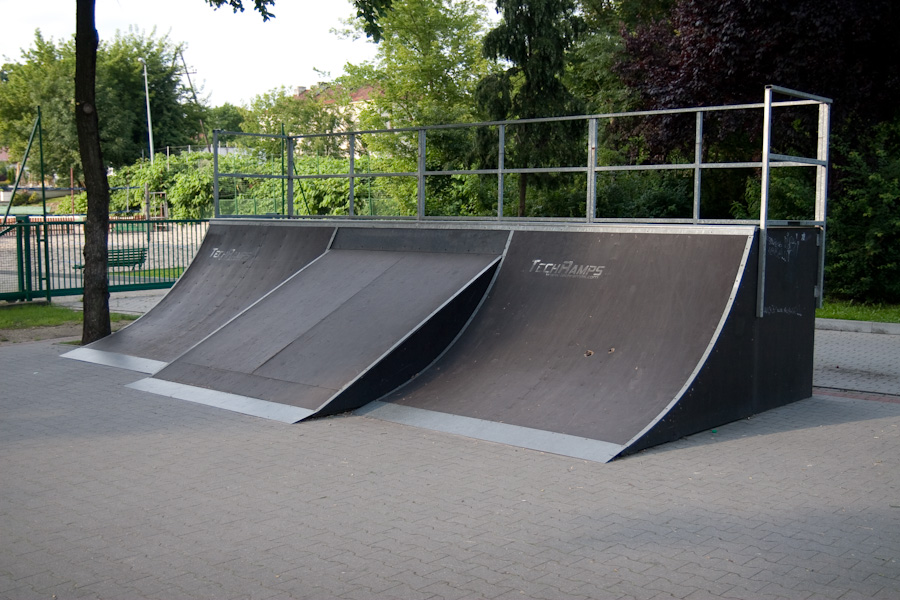
Skatepark

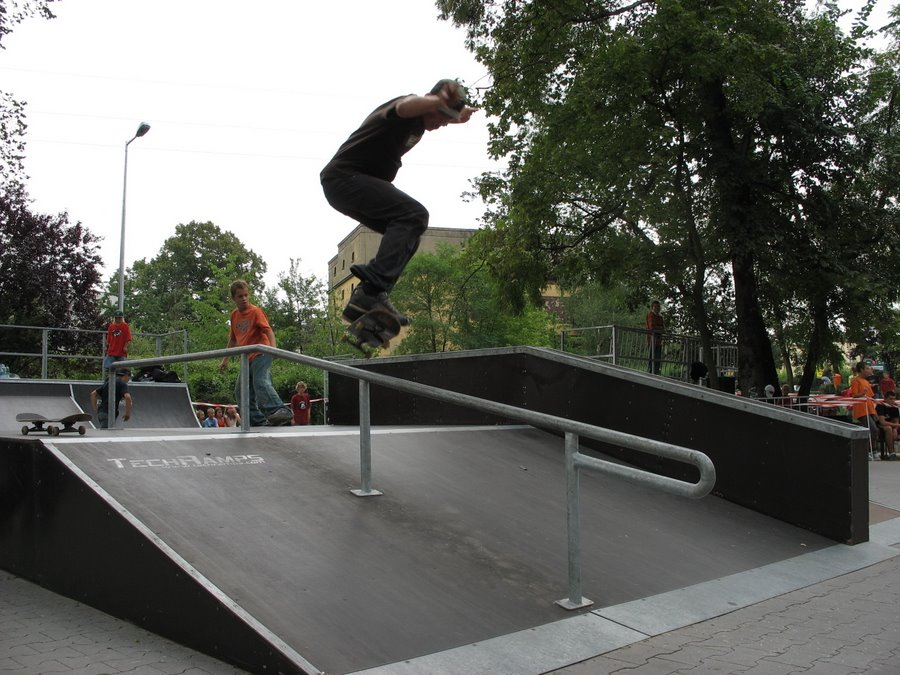
Skatepark2

The skatepark is located in a park named after Józef Piłsudski near Daszynski Street. The fence borders with the swimming pool. It is administered by the Municipality of Września, Wrzesinski Sports and Recreation Facilities.

It consists of five items of medium difficulty:

- bank
- pyramids
- funnbox
- grindbbox with handrail
- miniramp

The elements are arranged on a surface lined with paving stones. The facility has artificial lighting and is monitored. The object is for the purposes of physical culture, outdoor activities, skate training, organizing skate competitions and occupations of school physical education. The object can be used to organize other events on the basis of concluded agreements. Use of the skatepark is completely free and available, provided that children under 7 years old can use it under adult supervision.

=== Athletics ===
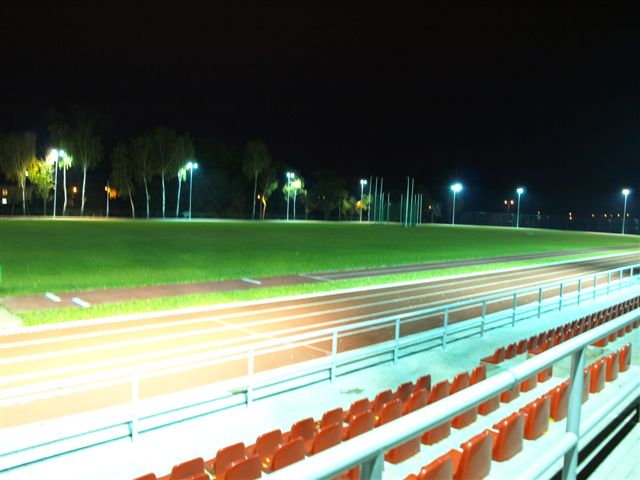
Court

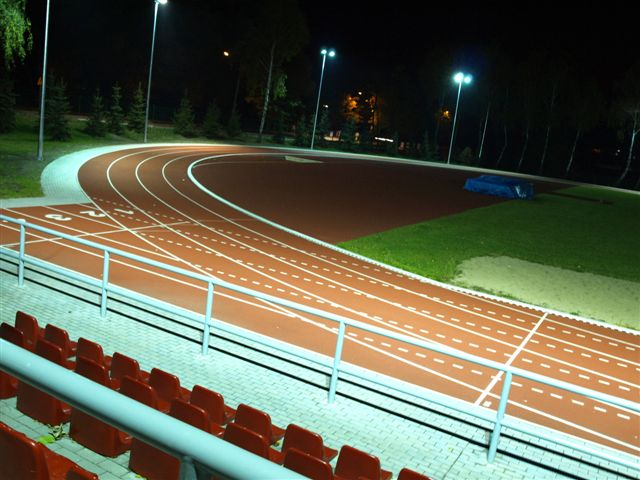
Court1

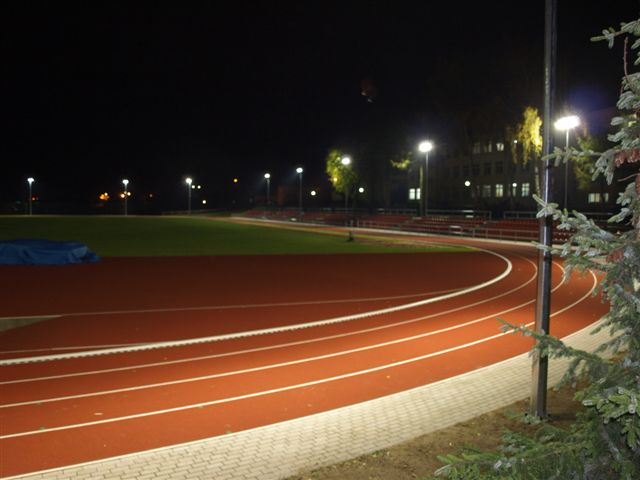
Court2

Athletics in Września is a very popular sport. One of the most popular place in Września is the athletic field and track at the School of Technical and General. General dr. Roman Abraham in Września, which is also the administrator of athletics stadium. The athletic stadium is open daily, according to a timetable. Use of the stadium is based on the consent of the director of the School of Technical and General based on a schedule. The possibilities and the principles of organizing events the stadium is determined by the director of the school. The site is organized athletics Thursdays for all schools from elementary through secondary schools.

=== Versatile sports fields ===
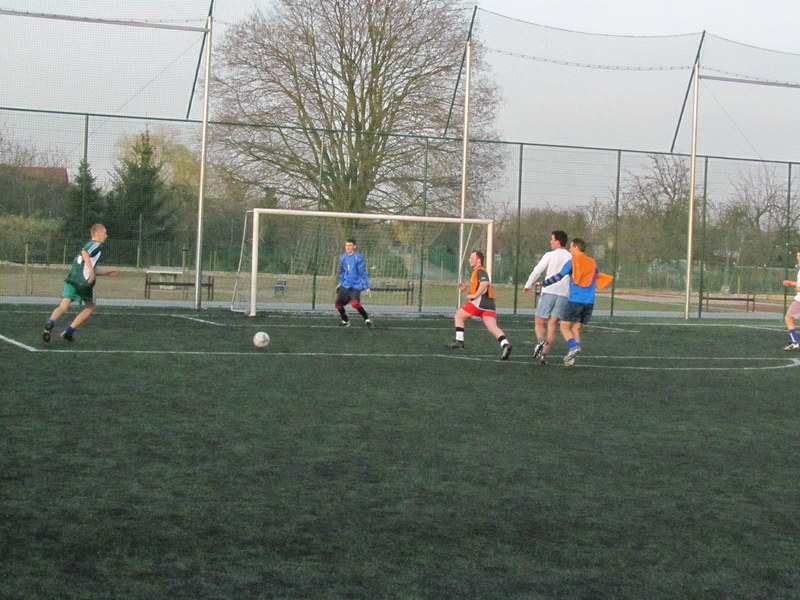
Football match on Orlik

Several versatile sports fields are placed in Września. There are sports complexes, which include basketball, volleyball and football. To use the fields arrangements must be made in advance by phone or in person. Booking is free. Fields are located at educational institutions:

- Middle school number 2 - 41st Słowackiego Street
- Middle school number 1 - 32nd Kosynierow Street
- Primary school number 1 - 1st Szkolna Street
- Primary school number - 24th Kościuszki Street - At this Orlik are played summer league game of football, volleyball and basketball. Considered the main Orlik Wrzesnia

=== Swimming pool ===
There are two swimming pools in Wrzesnia.

The indoor swimming pool Świat Wodny Cenos is located at 8 Koszarowa Street, in old buildings barracks of Prussia. The complex has:

- swimming pool 25 m long and 180 cm deep
- recreational pool and rehabilitation having a geyser
- wellness
- bar

The outdoor swimming pool is located in Basen Miejski - Łazienki on 32a Gnieźnienska Street and this is owned by the gmina (administrative district) Września, and managed by the municipal administrative unit Wrzesinski Osrodek Sportu i Rekreacji. The complex has:

- swimming pool - 25 m long and 180 cm deep with six lanes
- recreational pool - dimensions of pool are 25x40 m, and depth is maximum 120 cm
- waterslide - length waterslide is 55 m, waterslide is finish area inhibit, difference level 5 m, slope 10%. Waterslide has light system controlling motion in waterslide
- jumps on the pillow - both has dimensions 15x10 m. and allow for fun 7–8 person simultaneous. Motion in pillow administrating support for the pool
- changing and toilet - available for the people without restriction
- restaurant - provides full board and allows the free purchase of meals and drinks on the terrace surrounding

=== Ice rink ===
Ice rink is situated in the complex "Basen Miejski - Łazienki" and is owned by the municipality Września, and managed by the municipal administrative unit "Wrzesinski Osrodek Sportu i Rekreacji". In Ice rink is mounted installation of a "eis-grid" – tubes located in the sand. Medium – ethylene glycol. Installation can freeze sheet ice from the onset of the first frost. 40x25 meter rink dimensions. It is equipped with professional lighting a band hockey which allows staging of matches in the evening. In summer, when assembled a special rink liner will be used as a multipurpose sports field, it will be possible also skating. Ice rink has its own, independent from the rest of the object illumination.

=== Beach volleyball ===
Beach volleyball pitch is located in twice sandboxes (1+4), it have full dimensions, which enabled not only training, but also prowadzenie conducting games of the highest rank with Polish Championship inclusive.

=== Bowling ===
Bowling is located in Hotel Kosmowski on the 43 Wrocławska street. Bowling has 4 lanes.

Additional services offered:

- bar
- billiard table

=== The sport halls ===
In the area Września are situated two sports hall this type. On the 41 Slowackiego Street at Gimnazjum nr 2 im. Andrzeja Prądzyńskiego in Września, and on the Kosynierow 1 Street, at stadium Victoria Września (football club)

=== Multi-purpose hall ===
Arena at Stadium Victoria Września has dimensions 44x27x11. The grandstands for the fans spread are types „Polsport”, Total capacity is 406. The floor of arena has solid wood panels. Boards for basketball are hanged.

=== Corrective area ===
Corrective area has surface 155.7 m^{2}. Both rooms have full cloakroom facilities (7 rooms), sanitary (shower and toilet).

== Sport teams ==
=== Football ===
The only football club in Września is the MKS Victoria Września, found in 2014/2015 season in the third division.

=== Martial arts ===
In Września There are many places where you can improve skills in different martial styles. It is at the disposal several types of martial arts, among them: taekwodno and mixed martial arts

=== Taekwondo ===
Taekwondo is a worldwide martial art. This style is characterized by a large number of kicks, especially the spectacular jumping techniques. Possessed a high level of guarantee the full utilization of speed and strength, they stand on the human body. Training sessions are offered at the gym at the Gymnasium number 1 st. Kosynierów 32nd Is trained by Thomas Haremza - 1 dan Taekwondo WTF, Polish Vice 2007 in the category above 84th pounds.

=== MMA ===
MMA training is also held in the hall at Gymnasium number 1 They are divided into two parts - the collar and the ground floor. Trainings are conducted standing up by Przemysław Lis (five Polish champion in kickboxing and a representative of the club 'Red Dragon'). While 'ground fighters' training by Lukasz Matuszak (MMA fighter and BJJ purple belt holder.

=== Basketball ===
MKS Wrzesnia is one section basketball club. It brings together boys from the year 1998/1999 and younger. Training and MKS match held in the gymnasium at the Gymnasium number. 2 in September, in. Słowackiego 41st Players MKS Wrzesnia:

=== Futsal ===
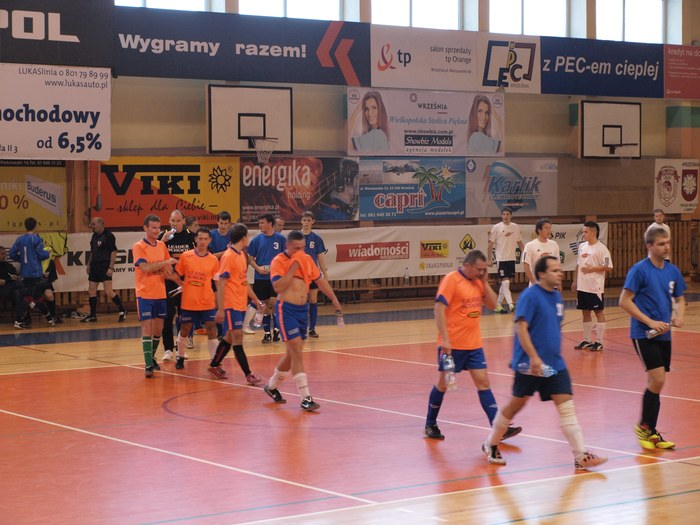
Players go down to the dressing room after the match played. 3 league WTPN

Every year during the winter is organized in Wrzesnia by WTPN futsal league. Society has created three leagues for players of varying skill levels - 1 league, 2, and 3 Division league. In addition to the league to emerge Września futsal champion (win - 3 points, draw - 1 point, defeat - 0 pts.) Organized the League Cup. It is run without rewanży knockout rule (winner goes on). Winners of two first places in each league will advance to the next until it reaches the highest level of competition that is one league. While the two teams last fall in a class below. Both the second and third division teams change every year, there is no well-defined leaders and top teams. But in a league for a long time the leaders are the teams:

- Capri
- Master Sport
- GGP/KGL

After the end of the games is chosen the best player, goalkeeper and scorer from each league.

=== Runners' club "Kosynier" Września ===
Runners' club "Kosynier" Września there from 7 May 2009 at the initiative of several fans running at different distances, representing Września in street races in the country and beyond its borders. KB Scytheman is entered into the National Court Register under the number 0000349819 Poznan. It has its own logo and website in the near future will have its own club clothes for both women and men in all ages. Club is growing very rapidly, representing his town in many professions.
