= Radomice =

Radomice may refer to the following places in Poland:

- Radomice, Lower Silesian Voivodeship (south-west Poland)
- Radomice, Kuyavian-Pomeranian Voivodeship (north-central Poland)
- Radomice, Greater Poland Voivodeship (west-central Poland)
