= Goniczki =

- Village
- Location within Poland
- Coordinates: 52°18′N 17°42′E
- Country: Poland
- Voivodeship: Greater Poland
- County: Września
- Gmina: Września

Goniczki [ɡɔˈnit͡ʂki] is a village in the administrative district of Gmina Września, within Września County, Greater Poland Voivodeship, in west-central Poland.
