= Ciemierów-Kolonia =

- Village
- Location within Poland
- Coordinates: 52°06′14″N 17°43′52″E
- Country: Poland
- Voivodeship: Greater Poland
- County: Września
- Gmina: Pyzdry

Ciemierów-Kolonia [t͡ɕɛˈmjɛruf kɔˈlɔɲa] is a village in the administrative district of Gmina Pyzdry, within Września County, Greater Poland Voivodeship, in west-central Poland.
