= Kolonia Lisewo =

- Settlement
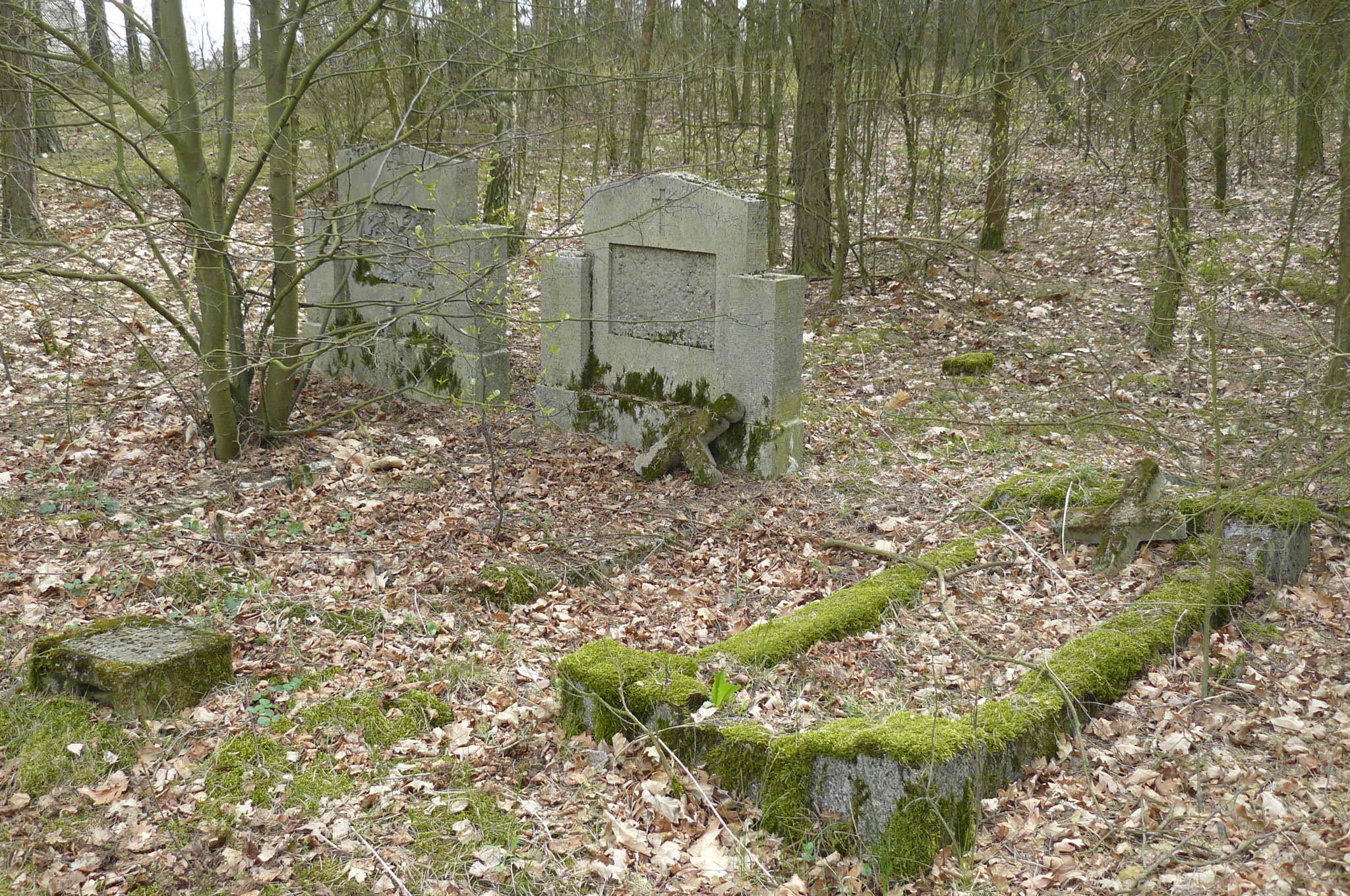
- Cemetery in Kolonia Lisewo

- Location within Poland
- Coordinates: 52°06′34″N 17°42′29″E
- Country: Poland
- Voivodeship: Greater Poland
- County: Września
- Gmina: Pyzdry

Kolonia Lisewo [kɔˈlɔɲa liˈsɛvɔ] is a settlement in the administrative district of Gmina Pyzdry, within Września County, Greater Poland Voivodeship, in west-central Poland.
