= Ruda Komorska =

- Village
- Location within Poland
- Coordinates: 52°7′N 17°41′E
- Country: Poland
- Voivodeship: Greater Poland
- County: Września
- Gmina: Pyzdry

Ruda Komorska [ˈruda kɔˈmɔrska] is a village in the administrative district of Gmina Pyzdry, within Września County, Greater Poland Voivodeship, in west-central Poland.

As part of Congress Poland, the village was the westernmost point of the Russian Empire between 1815 and 1915.
