= Wrąbczynkowskie Holendry =

- Village
- Location within Poland
- Coordinates: 52°10′N 17°48′E
- Country: Poland
- Voivodeship: Greater Poland
- County: Września
- Gmina: Pyzdry
- Population: 159

Wrąbczynkowskie Holendry [vrɔmpt͡ʂɨnˈkɔfskʲɛ xɔˈlɛndrɨ] is a village in the administrative district of Gmina Pyzdry, within Września County, Greater Poland Voivodeship, in west-central Poland.
