= List of extreme points of Russia =

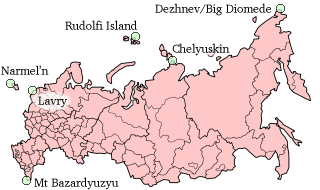
Extreme points of Russia

This is a list of the extreme points and extreme elevations in Russia.

The northernmost and easternmost points of Russia coincide with those of Eurasia (both for the mainland and including the islands).

== Extreme coordinates ==
Including islands and exclaves

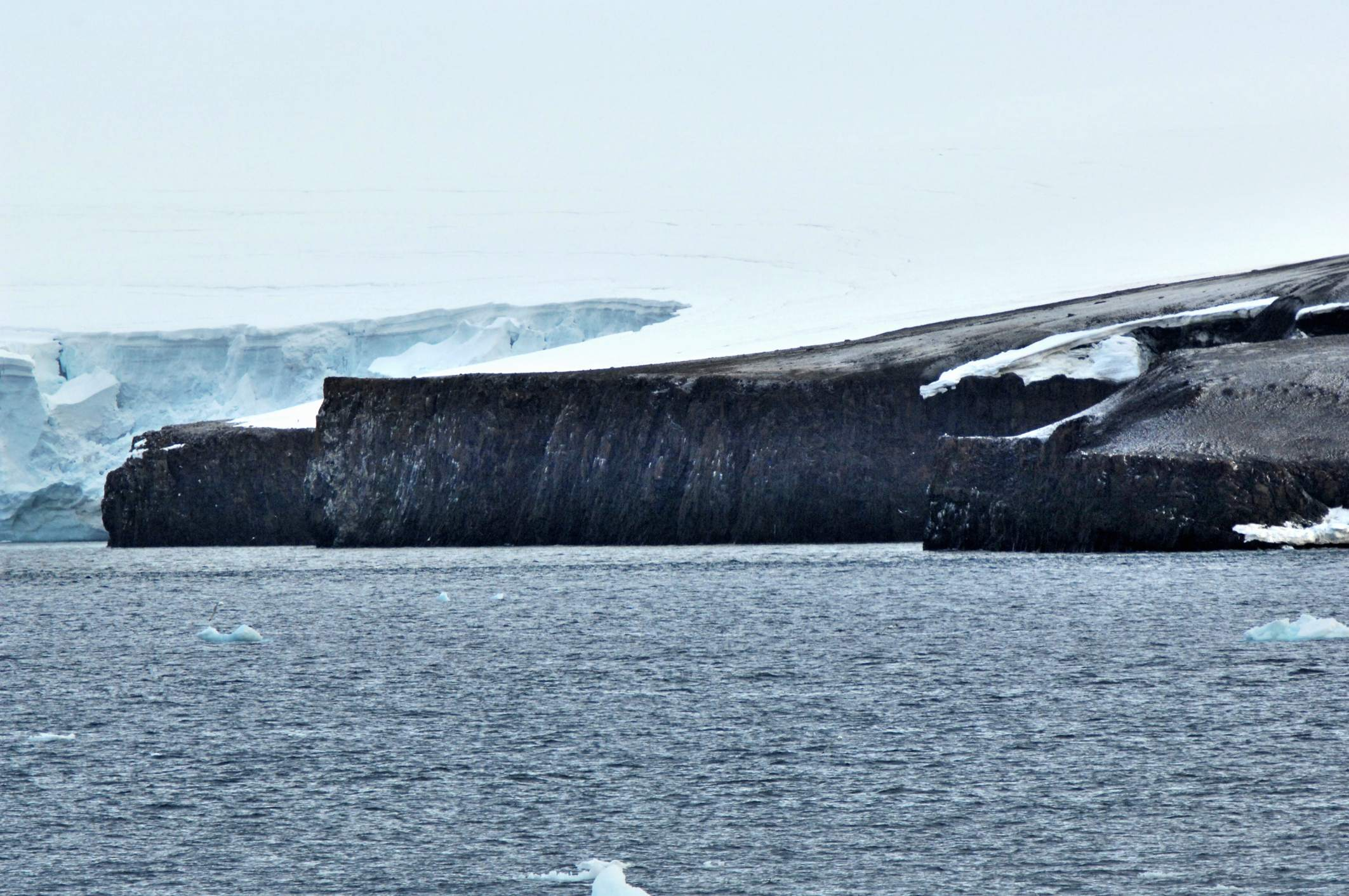
Cape Fligely

- Northernmost point — near Cape Fligely, Rudolf Island, Franz Josef Land, Arkhangelsk Oblast – (81°50′35″N 59°14′22″E)
- Southernmost point — near Ragdan, Republic of Dagestan (41°13′14″N 47°51′28″E)
- Westernmost point — Narmeln, Vistula Spit, Kaliningrad Oblast –º(54°27′30″N 19°38′19″E)
- Easternmost point^{1} — Big Diomede Island, Chukotka Autonomous Okrug – (65°47′N 169°01′W)

Contiguous mainland only

- Northernmost point — Cape Chelyuskin, Krasnoyarsk Krai (77°43'N)
- Southernmost point — near Ragdan, Republic of Dagestan (41°12'N)
- Westernmost point — near Lavry, Pskov Oblast (27°19'E)
- Easternmost point^{1} — Cape Dezhnev (East Cape), Chukotka Autonomous Okrug (169°40'W)

Towns and cities

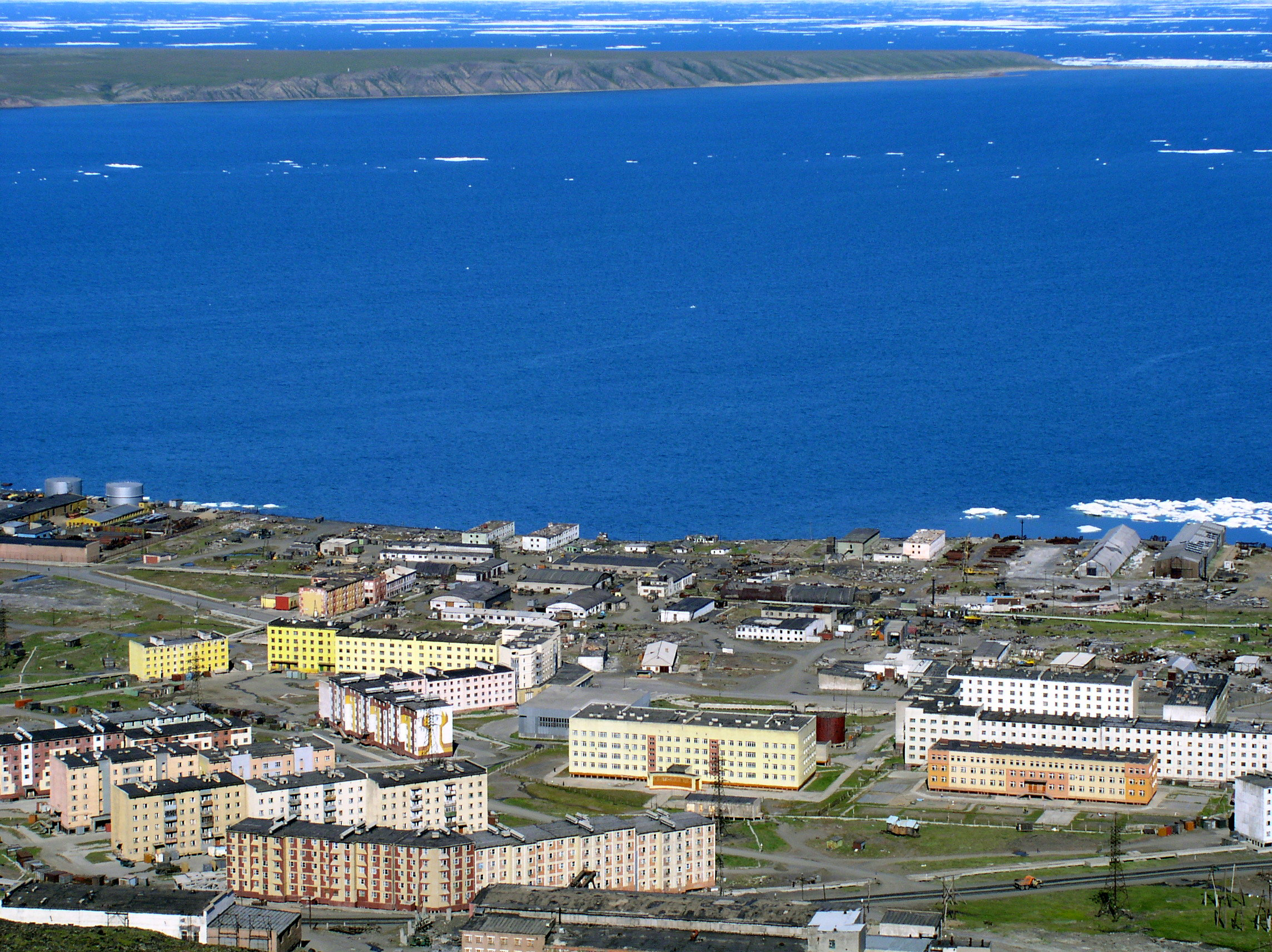
The town of Pevek

- Northernmost — Pevek, Chukotka Autonomous Okrug (69°42′N)
- Southernmost — Derbent, Republic of Dagestan (42°04′N)
- Westernmost — Baltiysk, Kaliningrad Oblast (19°55′E)
- Easternmost — Anadyr, Chukotka Autonomous Okrug (177°30′E)

Permanent settlements

- Northernmost — Dikson (73°30′N)
- Southernmost — Kurush, Republic of Dagestan (41°16′N)
- Westernmost — Baltiysk, Kaliningrad Oblast (19°55′E)
- Easternmost^{1} — Uelen, Chukotka Autonomous Okrug (169°48′W)

^{1}according to the path of the International Date Line, although being located in the Western Hemisphere.

Historically, pre-Soviet Russia

- Southernmost from 1881 — Kushka in present-day Turkmenistan (35°16′N)
- Westernmost 1815–1915 — Ruda Komorska in Congress Poland (17°41′E)
- Easternmost 1799–1867 — Same as the easternmost point of Alaska, then also the International Date Line. (129°59′W)
- Elevation until 1869 — Denali in Alaska, then called Bolshaya, 6,194 metres (20,322 ft)

Historically, Soviet Union

- Northernmost — Same as Russia today, from 1926 when Franz Josef Land was annexed
- Southernmost — Kushka in present-day Turkmenistan
- Westernmost — Same as Russia today, from 1945
- Easternmost — Same as Russia today
- Elevation — Ismoil Somoni Peak in Tajikistan, then called Communism Peak, at 7,495 metres (24,590 ft).

== Elevation extremes ==
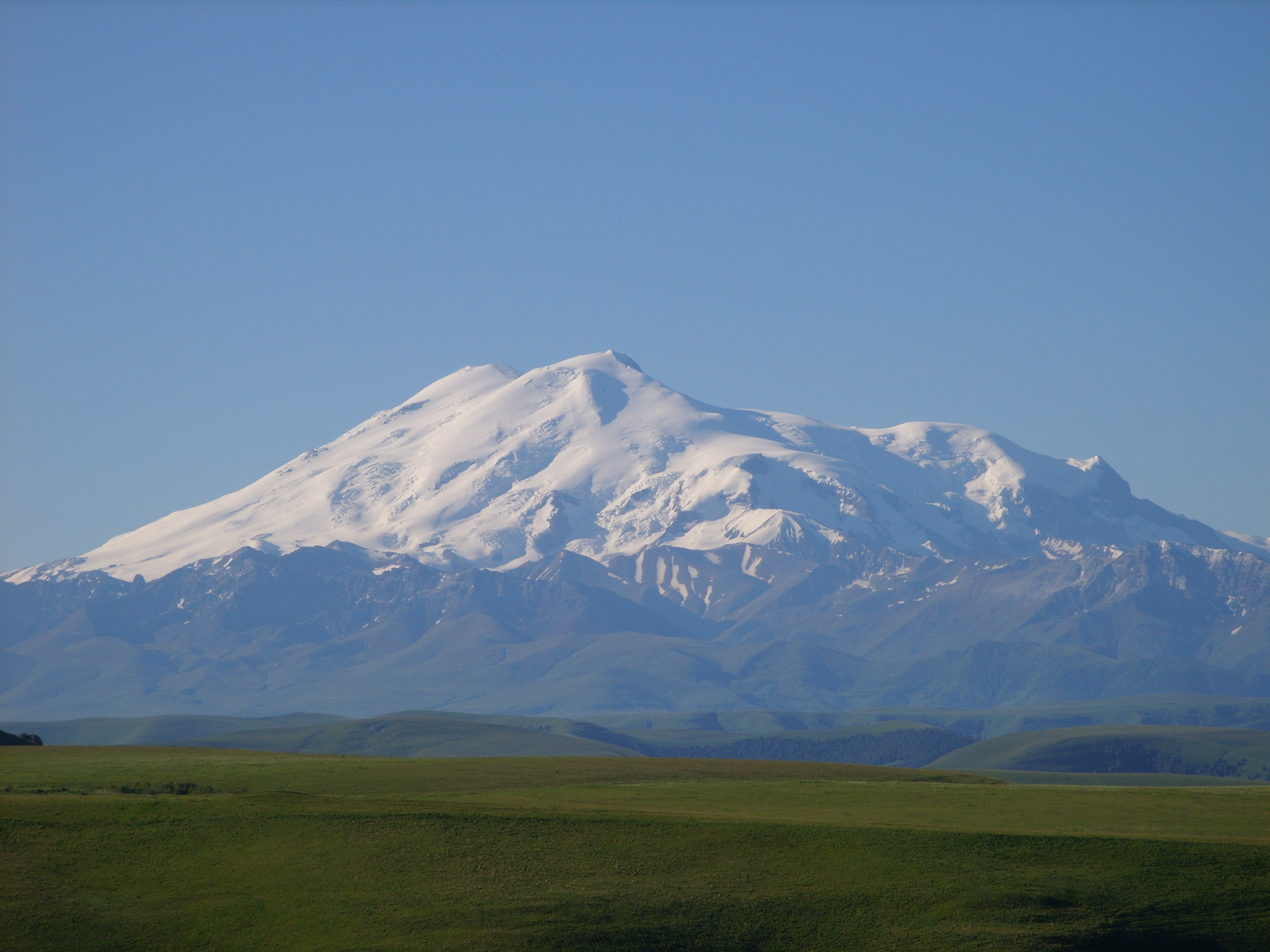
Mount Elbrus

- Lowest point: Caspian Sea level: −28 metres (−92 ft)
- Highest point: west summit of Mount Elbrus: 5,642 metres (18,510 ft)
- Highest active volcano of Eurasia: Klyuchevskaya Sopka: 4,750 metres (15,580 ft)

== Extreme distances ==
- Greatest driving distance between any two points via the Russian road network: 13800 km from Rayakoski, Murmansk Oblast to Zapadno-Ozernoye field, Anadyr District, Chukotka Autonomous Okrug. This route through the R504 Kolyma Highway and Anadyr Highway usually includes many ferries and fords acrosses and winter roads. The greatest driving distance excluding ferries, fords and driving over ice is 10800 km from Rayakoski, Murmansk Oblast to Khasan, Primorsky Krai.

== See also ==
- Extreme points of Earth
- Geography of Russia
