= Górne Grądy =

- Village
- Location within Poland
- Coordinates: 52°6′10″N 17°45′40″E
- Country: Poland
- Voivodeship: Greater Poland
- County: Września
- Gmina: Pyzdry

Górne Grądy [ˈɡurnɛ ˈɡrɔndɨ] is a village in the administrative district of Gmina Pyzdry, within Września County, Greater Poland Voivodeship, in west-central Poland.
