= Kolonia Janowska =

- Settlement
- Location within Poland
- Coordinates: 52°06′07″N 17°45′17″E
- Country: Poland
- Voivodeship: Greater Poland
- County: Września
- Gmina: Pyzdry

Kolonia Janowska [kɔˈlɔɲa jaˈnɔfska] is a settlement in the administrative district of Gmina Pyzdry, within Września County, Greater Poland Voivodeship, in west-central Poland.
