= Osowo, Września County =

Osowo
- Village
- Location within Poland
- Coordinates: 52°16′N 17°33′E
- Country: Poland
- Voivodeship: Greater Poland
- County: Września
- Gmina: Września

Osowo [ɔˈsɔvɔ] is a village in the administrative district of Gmina Września, within Września County, Greater Poland Voivodeship, in west-central Poland.
