= Psary Polskie =

- Village
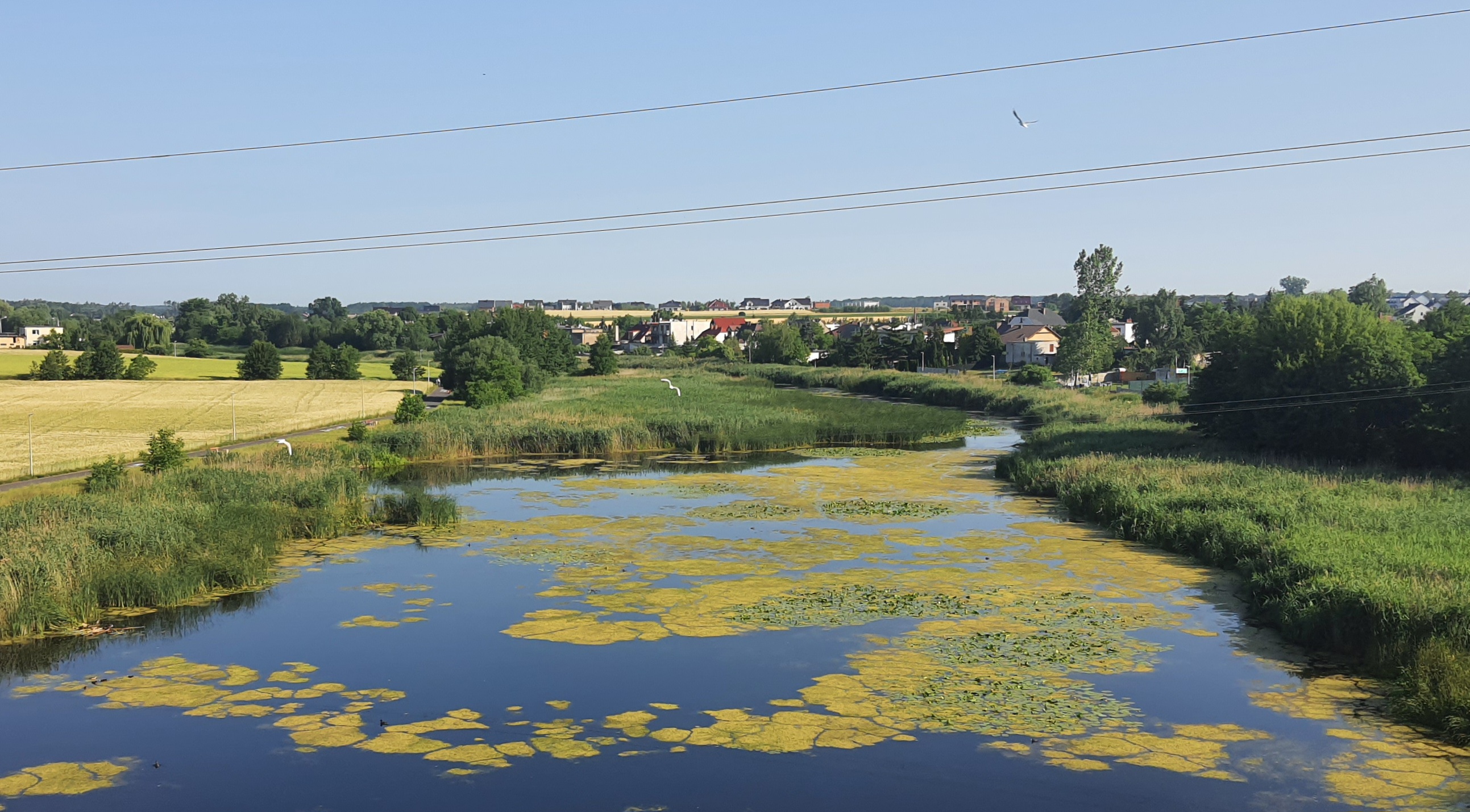

- Location within Poland
- Coordinates: 52°21′N 17°32′E
- Country: Poland
- Voivodeship: Greater Poland
- County: Września
- Gmina: Września

Psary Polskie [ˈpsarɨ ˈpɔlskʲɛ] is a village in the administrative district of Gmina Września, within Września County, Greater Poland Voivodeship, in west-central Poland.
