= Łupice, Greater Poland Voivodeship =

Łupice
- Village
- Location within Poland
- Coordinates: 52°6′55″N 17°41′15″E
- Country: Poland
- Voivodeship: Greater Poland
- County: Września
- Gmina: Pyzdry
- Population: 40

Łupice [wuˈpit͡sɛ] is a village in the administrative district of Gmina Pyzdry, within Września County, Greater Poland Voivodeship, in west-central Poland.
