= Gozdowo-Młyn =

- Settlement
- Location within Poland
- Coordinates: 52°17′0″N 17°40′15″E
- Country: Poland
- Voivodeship: Greater Poland
- County: Września
- Gmina: Września

Gozdowo-Młyn [ɡɔzˈdɔvɔ ˈmwɨn] is a settlement in the administrative district of Gmina Września, within Września County, Greater Poland Voivodeship, in west-central Poland.

== See also ==
- Gozdowo
