= Kawęczyn, Września County =

Kawęczyn
- Village
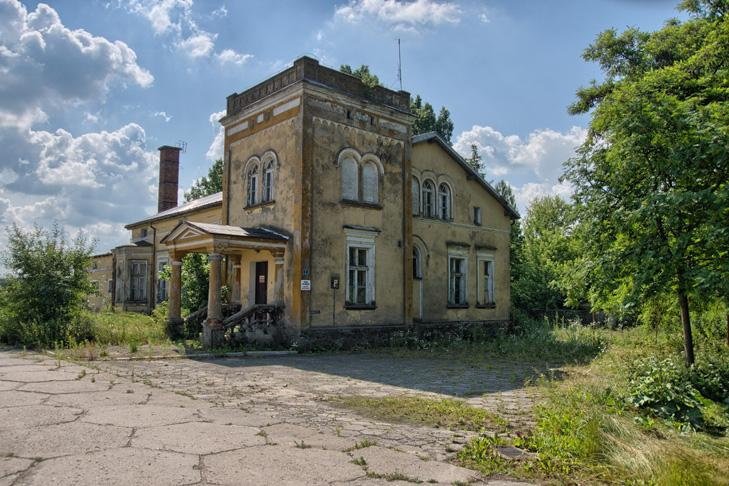
- Manor in Kawęczyn

- Location within Poland
- Coordinates: 52°24′01″N 17°33′26″E
- Country: Poland
- Voivodeship: Greater Poland
- County: Września
- Gmina: Września

Kawęczyn [kaˈvɛnt͡ʂɨn] is a village in the administrative district of Gmina Września, within Września County, Greater Poland Voivodeship, in west-central Poland.
