= Kamień, Września County =

Kamień
- Settlement
- Location within Poland
- Coordinates: 52°05′50″N 17°46′55″E
- Country: Poland
- Voivodeship: Greater Poland
- County: Września
- Gmina: Pyzdry

Kamień (Polish pronunciation: [ˈkamjɛj̃]) is a settlement in the administrative district of Gmina Pyzdry, within Września County, Greater Poland Voivodeship, in west-central Poland.
