= Żerniki, Września County =

Żerniki
- Village
- Location within Poland
- Coordinates: 52°19′29″N 17°29′39″E
- Country: Poland
- Voivodeship: Greater Poland
- County: Września
- Gmina: Września

Żerniki (Polish pronunciation: [ʐɛrˈɲikʲi]) is a village in the administrative district of Gmina Września, within Września County, Greater Poland Voivodeship, in west-central Poland.
