= Benewicze =

- Settlement
- Location within Poland
- Coordinates: 52°09′7.72″N 17°42′24.4″E
- Country: Poland
- Voivodeship: Greater Poland
- County: Września
- Gmina: Pyzdry
- Population: 8

Benewicze [bɛnɛˈvit͡ʂɛ] is a settlement in the administrative district of Gmina Pyzdry, within Września County, Greater Poland Voivodeship, in west-central Poland.
