= Walga =

Walga may refer to:

- Walga village a locality in Poland
- Walga Rock a rock in Western Australia
- WALGA an organisation in Western Australia
