= Arcade house, Pyzdry =

Arcade house in Pyzdry
- Dom podcieniowy w Pyzdrach
- Location within Poland

General information
- Type: Arcade house
- Location: Pyzdry, Poland, Poland
- Coordinates: 52°10′1.15″N 17°41′18.10″E

Arcade house in Pyzdry is a bungalow built in 1768 and located in the square in Pyzdry. It was renovated several times, underwent major overhaul in 1956–1957. Its gable wall fronts the square. It is plastered and has a light-frame construction. At the front the arcade is supported by four wooden pillars, which were replaced in 1957. For several years it was the seat of the Regional Museum in Pyzdry and now it is used for organising temporary exhibitions.
