= Dębina, Września County =

Dębina
- Village
- Location within Poland
- Coordinates: 52°18′50″N 17°35′42″E
- Country: Poland
- Voivodeship: Greater Poland
- County: Września
- Gmina: Września

Dębina [dɛmˈbina] is a village in the administrative district of Gmina Września, within Września County, Greater Poland Voivodeship, in west-central Poland.
