= Kruszyny, Greater Poland Voivodeship =

Kruszyny
- Village
- Location within Poland
- Coordinates: 52°8′26″N 17°42′22″E
- Country: Poland
- Voivodeship: Greater Poland
- County: Września
- Gmina: Pyzdry
- Population: 12

Kruszyny [kruˈʂɨnɨ] is a village in the administrative district of Gmina Pyzdry, within Września County, Greater Poland Voivodeship, in west-central Poland.
