= Modlica, Greater Poland Voivodeship =

Modlica
- Settlement
- Location within Poland
- Coordinates: 52°8′N 17°40′E
- Country: Poland
- Voivodeship: Greater Poland
- County: Września
- Gmina: Pyzdry

Modlica [mɔdˈlit͡sa] is a settlement in the administrative district of Gmina Pyzdry, within Września County, Greater Poland Voivodeship, in west-central Poland.
