= Nowy Folwark, Września County =

Nowy Folwark
- Village
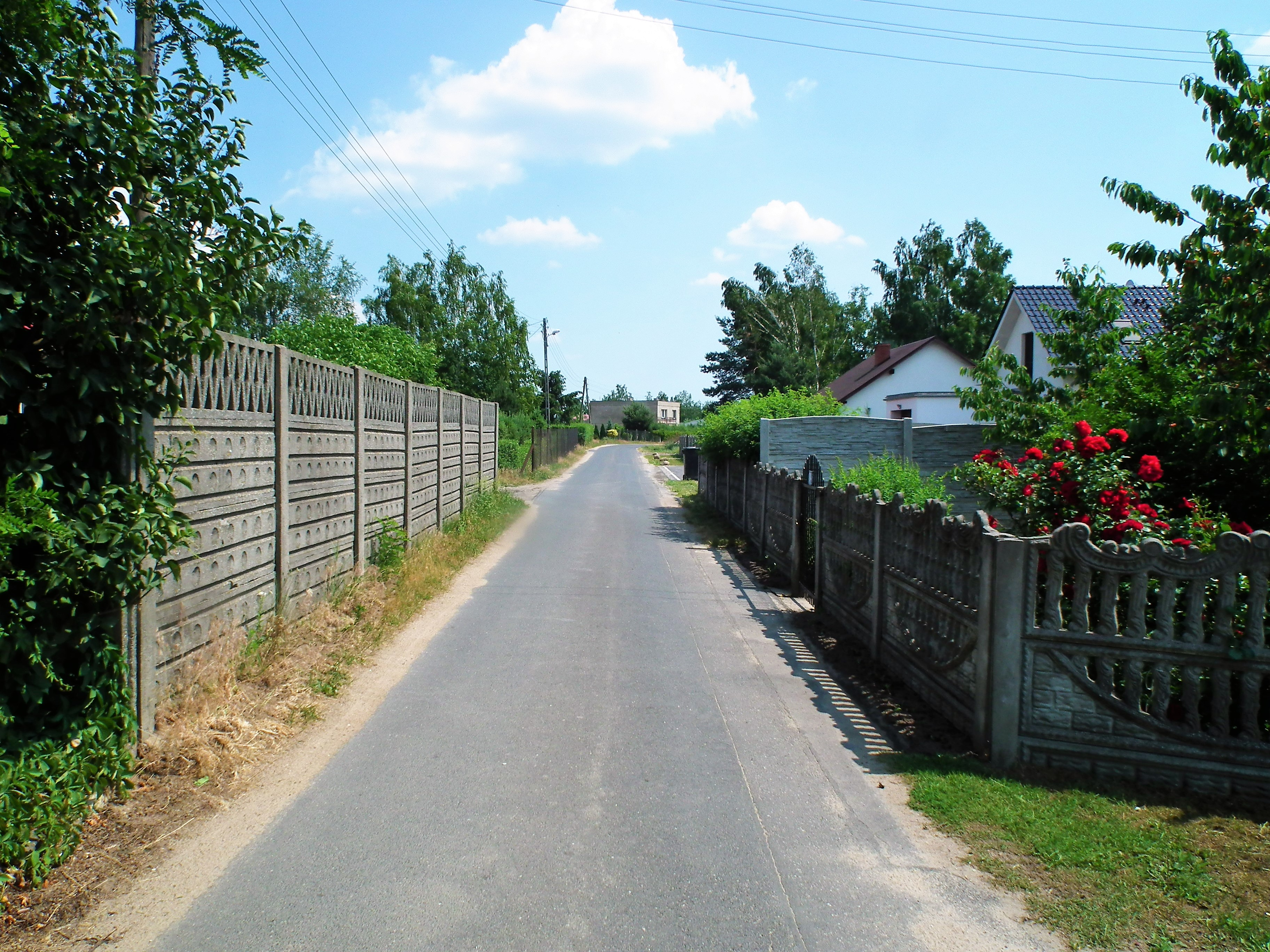
- Street of Nowy Folwark, Września County

- Location within Poland
- Coordinates: 52°20′03″N 17°30′00″E
- Country: Poland
- Voivodeship: Greater Poland
- County: Września
- Gmina: Września

Nowy Folwark [ˈnɔvɨ ˈfɔlvark] is a village in the administrative district of Gmina Września, within Września County, Greater Poland Voivodeship, in west-central Poland.
