= Psary Wielkie =

- Village
- Location within Poland
- Coordinates: 52°21′N 17°30′E
- Country: Poland
- Voivodeship: Greater Poland
- County: Września
- Gmina: Września

Psary Wielkie [ˈpsarɨ ˈvjɛlkʲɛ] is a village in the administrative district of Gmina Września, within Września County, Greater Poland Voivodeship, in west-central Poland. As of 2021 census, it has a population of 123.
