= Czachrowo =

- Village
- Location within Poland
- Coordinates: 52°18′30″N 17°33′6″E
- Country: Poland
- Voivodeship: Greater Poland
- County: Września
- Gmina: Września

Czachrowo [t͡ʂaˈxrɔvɔ] is a village in the administrative district of Gmina Września, within Września County, Greater Poland Voivodeship, in west-central Poland.
