= Rataje, Września County =

Rataje
- Village
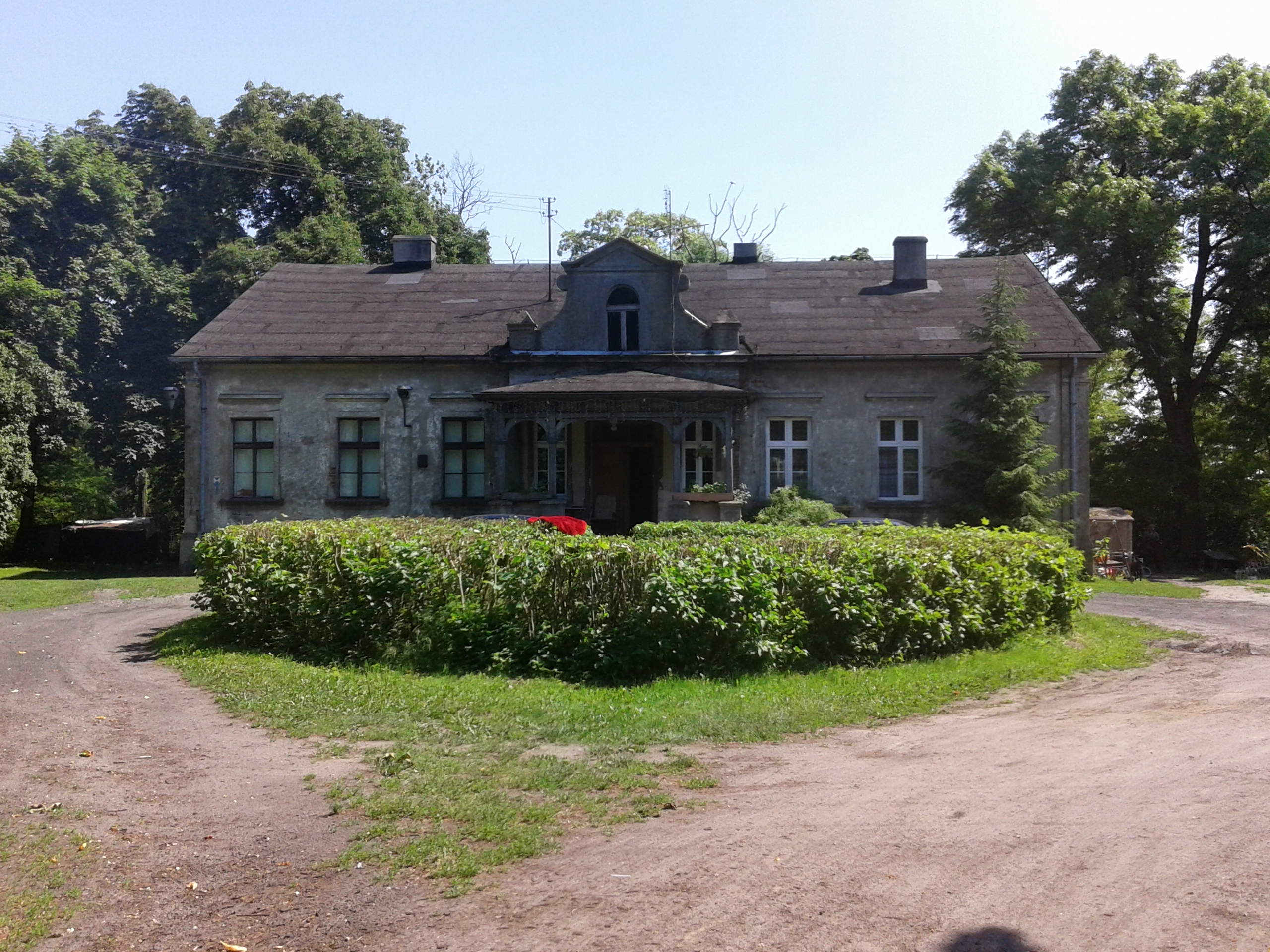
- Historic manor in Rataje

- Location within Poland
- Coordinates: 52°11′N 17°43′E
- Country: Poland
- Voivodeship: Greater Poland
- County: Września
- Gmina: Pyzdry
- Population: 430
- Time zone: UTC+1 (CET)
  - Summer (DST): UTC+2 (CEST)
- Vehicle registration: PWR

Rataje [raˈtajɛ] is a village in the administrative district of Gmina Pyzdry, within Września County, Greater Poland Voivodeship, in west-central Poland.

There is a historic Rataje Manor in the village.

== History ==
Rataje was a royal village, administratively located in the Pyzdry County in the Kalisz Voivodeship in the Greater Poland Province of the Kingdom of Poland.

In the Second Partition of Poland, in 1793, it was annexed by Prussia. In 1807 it was regained by Poles and included within the newly established, however short-lived Duchy of Warsaw. Following the duchy's dissolution in 1815, it fell to the Russian Partition of Poland. On April 28, 1863, a Polish insurgent unit left Rataje to fight in the Battle of Pyzdry nearby. In 1918 Poland regained independence and control of the village.

Following the joint German-Soviet invasion of Poland, which started World War II in September 1939, the village was occupied by Germany until 1945.
