= Rataje Manor =

Manor in Rataje
- Dwór w Ratajach
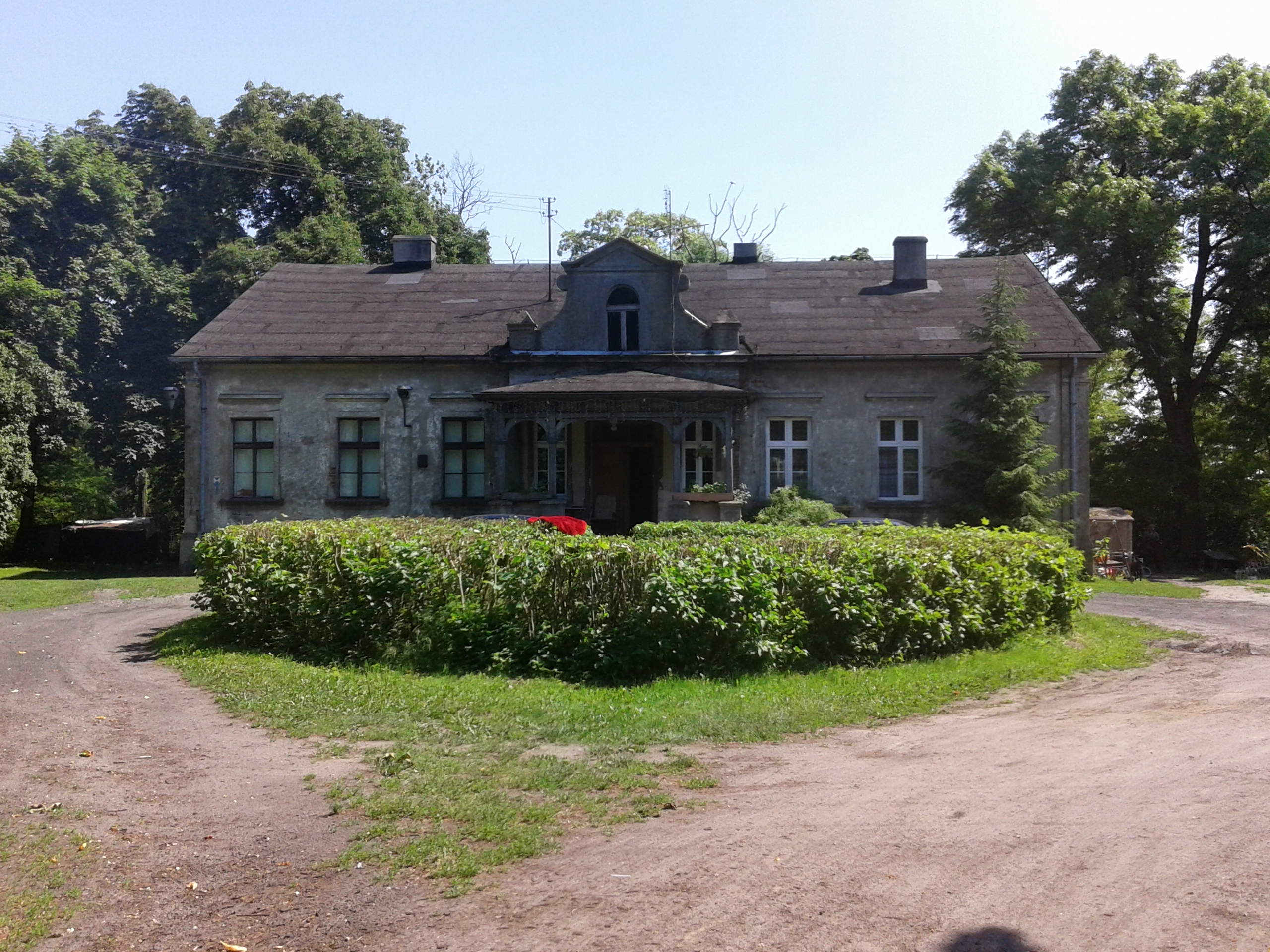

- Location within Poland

General information
- Type: Manor house
- Location: Rataje, Września County, Poland, Poland
- Coordinates: 52°11′29.63″N 17°42′58.16″E
- Inaugurated: 19th century

The Manor in Rataje (Polish: Dwór w Ratajach) is a dwór (manor house) in Rataje, Poland which was built in the 19th century. It is a symmetrical single-floor building built in the style of minimalism. The building has a tympanum in pseudobaroque style and a wood porch. Currently the roof is covered with asphalt. It is surrounded by a landscaped park with an area of about 8 hectares. A short avenue of chestnut trees runs to the manor. On the west side of the park is a wooden granary, which is a remnant of the farm. Currently it is the youth club, and a library.

== Gallery ==
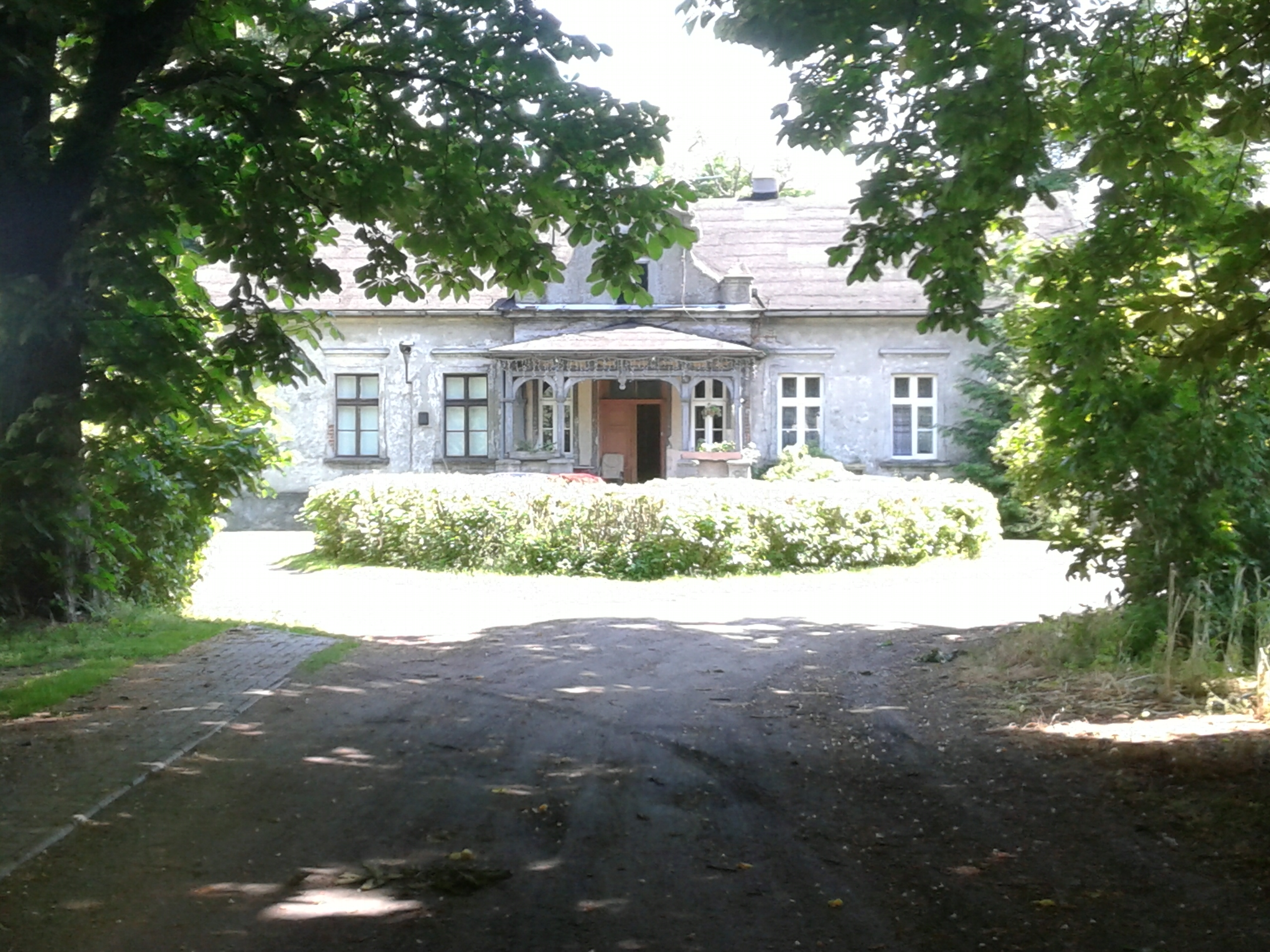
Manor and alley of chestnuts

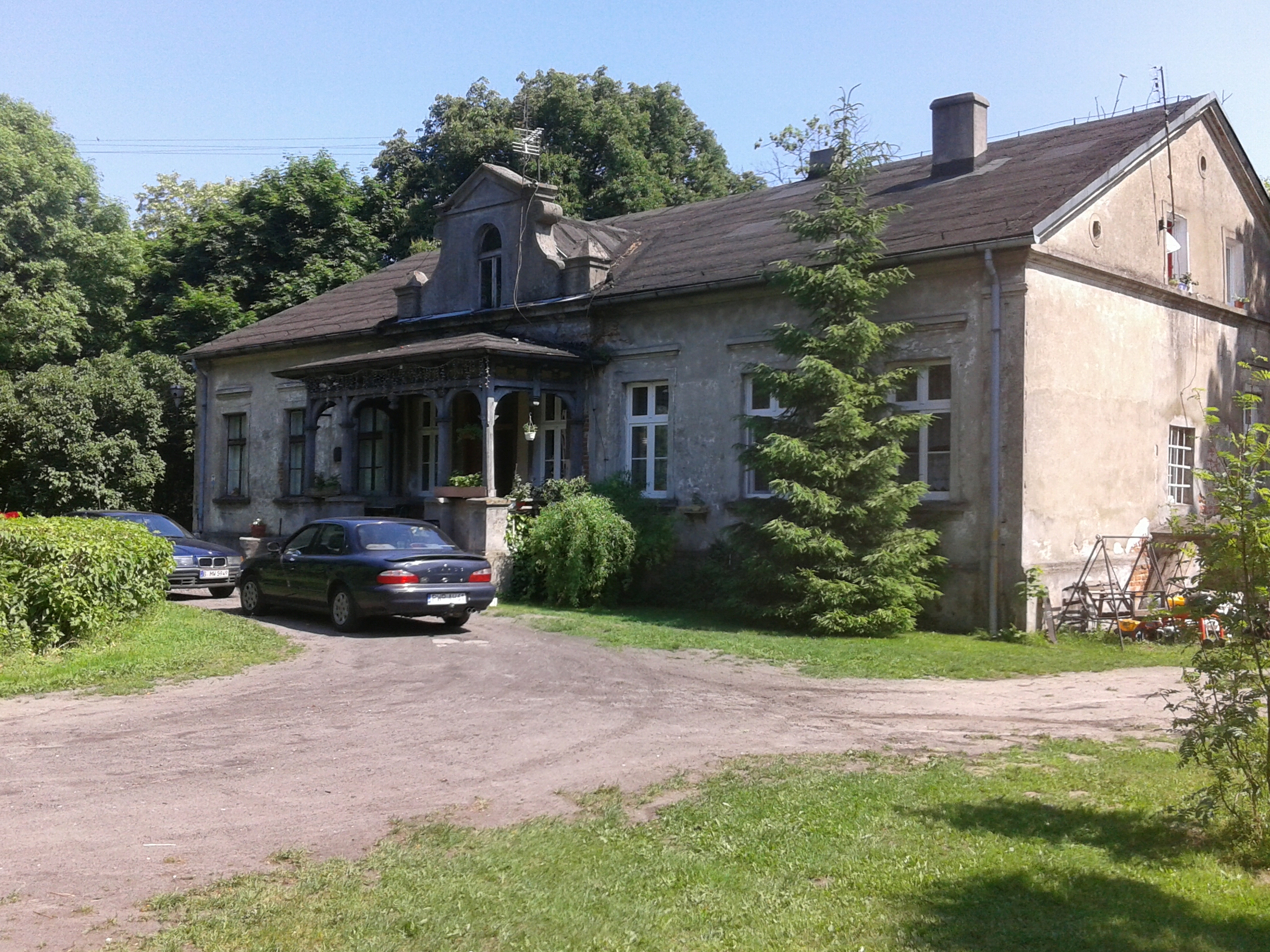
Manor of the north - west side

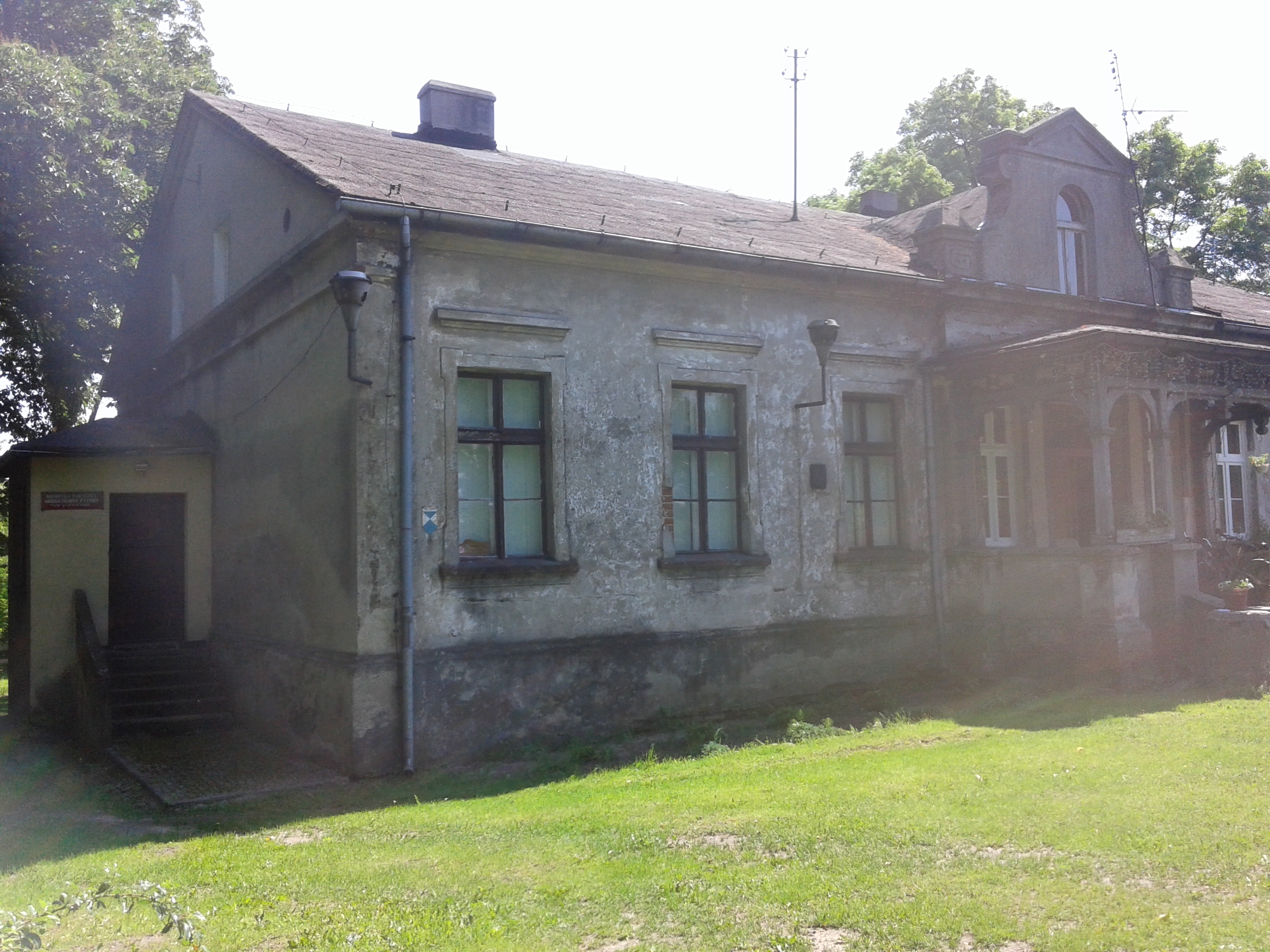
Manor of the north - east side

== Bibliography ==
- Pałac w Ratajach może przejść w prywatne ręce
- Anders, Paweł, Robert M. Czerniak, Przemysław Kowalski, Aleksander Winiecki. Pyzdry miasto nad Wartą. Poznań: Abos. ISBN 83-85811-00-1.
