= Ragdan =

Mountain in Azerbaijan and Russia

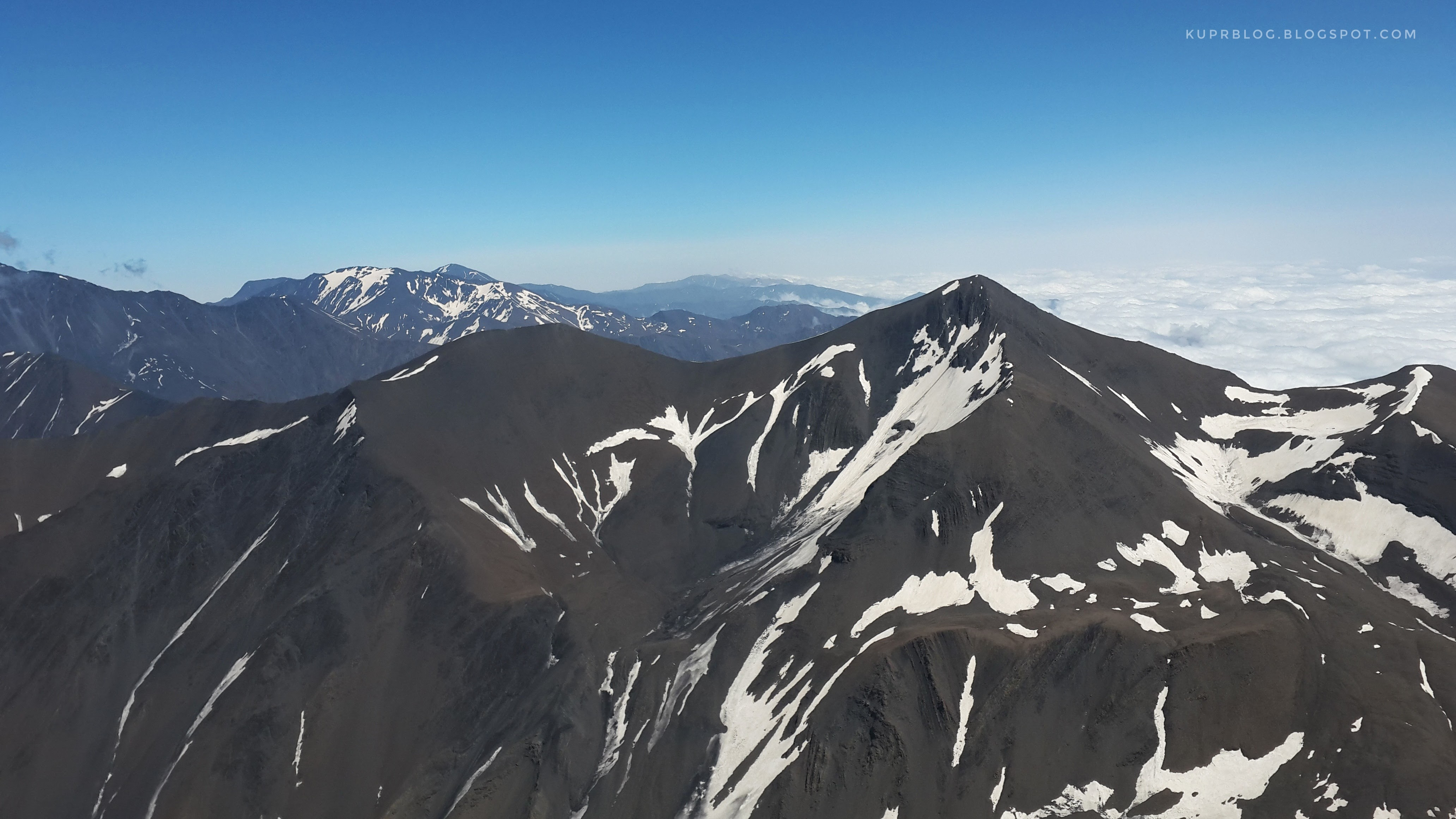

Highest point
- Elevation: 4,020 m (13,190 ft)
- Coordinates: 41°11′33.3″N 47°45′25″E

Geography
- Location within Caucasus Mountains Location within Azerbaijan Location within Russia
- Countries: Azerbaijan; Russia

Ragdan (Azerbaijani: Raqdan; Russian: Рагдан) is a mountain peak of the Greater Caucasus range, located in the Qusar District of Azerbaijan and Dokuzparinsky District of Dagestan, Russia. It has elevation of 4,020 metres (13,189 ft) above sea level.

== Geography ==
Ragdan sits among two other peaks in the Greater Caucasus range, Bazarduzu and Charundagh. The southernmost point of Russia is located 2,2 kilometres east of Ragdan, at an altitude of over 3,500 metres (11,483 ft).
