= Gmina Pyzdry =

Gmina Pyzdry Pyzdry Commune
- Gmina
- Coat of arms
- Interactive map of Gmina Pyzdry
- Coordinates (Pyzdry): 52°10′N 17°41′E
- Country: Poland
- Voivodeship: Greater Poland
- County: Września
- Seat: Pyzdry

Area
  - Total: 137.9 km^{2} (53.2 sq mi)

Population (2006)
  - Total: 7,217
  - Density: 52.34/km^{2} (135.5/sq mi)
  - Urban: 3,188
  - Rural: 4,029
- Website: http://www.pyzdry.pl/

Gmina Pyzdry is an urban-rural gmina (administrative district) in Września County, Greater Poland Voivodeship, in west-central Poland. Its seat is the town of Pyzdry, which lies approximately 20 kilometres (12 mi) south of Września and 59 km (37 mi) south-east of the regional capital Poznań.

The gmina covers an area of 137.9 square kilometres (53.2 sq mi), and as of 2006 its total population is 7,217 (out of which the population of Pyzdry amounts to 3,188, and the population of the rural part of the gmina is 4,029).

The gmina contains part of the protected area called Warta Landscape Park.

== Villages ==
Apart from the town of Pyzdry, Gmina Pyzdry contains the villages and settlements of Baraniec, Benewicze, Białobrzeg, Białobrzeg Ratajski, Ciemierów, Ciemierów-Kolonia, Dłusk, Dolne Grądy, Glinianki, Górne Grądy, Kamień, Kolonia Janowska, Kolonia Lisewo, Królewiny, Kruszyny, Ksawerów, Lisewo, Lisiaki, Łupice, Modlica, Olsz, Pietrzyków, Pietrzyków-Kolonia, Rataje, Ruda Komorska, Tarnowa, Tłoczyzna, Trzcianki, Walga, Wrąbczynek, Wrąbczynkowskie Holendry, Zamość, Zapowiednia, Żdżary and Zimochowiec.

== Neighbouring gminas ==
Gmina Pyzdry is bordered by the gminas of Gizałki, Kołaczkowo, Lądek, Zagórów and Żerków.
