= Radomice, Greater Poland Voivodeship =

Radomice
- Village
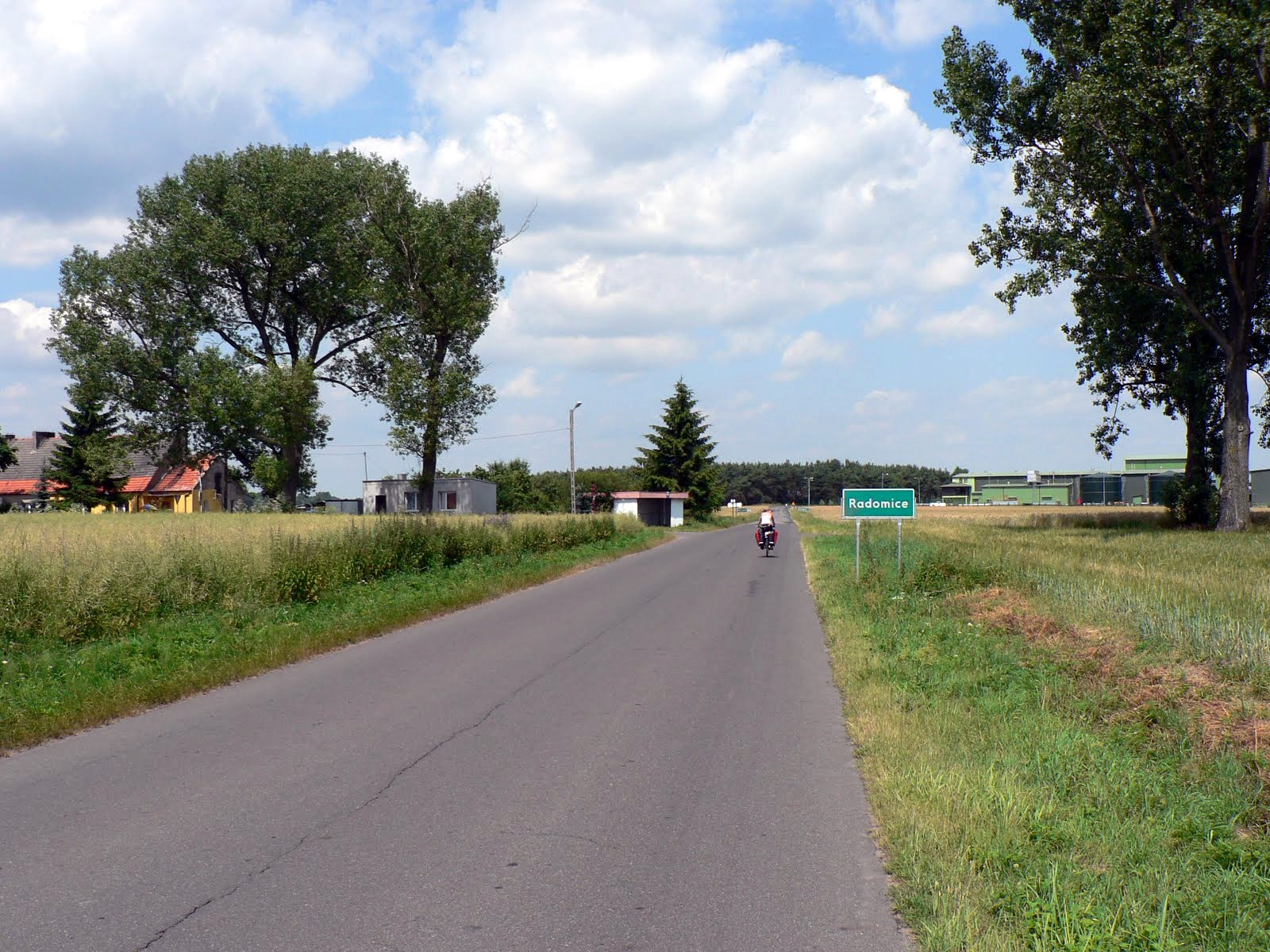
- Street and road sign of Radomice

- Location within Poland
- Coordinates: 52°23′39″N 17°30′2″E
- Country: Poland
- Voivodeship: Greater Poland
- County: Września
- Gmina: Września

Radomice [radɔˈmit͡sɛ] is a village in the administrative district of Gmina Września, within Września County, Greater Poland Voivodeship, in west-central Poland.
