= Nadarzyce, Września County =

Nadarzyce
- Village
- Location within Poland
- Coordinates: 52°18′N 17°37′E
- Country: Poland
- Voivodeship: Greater Poland
- County: Września
- Gmina: Września

Nadarzyce [nadaˈʐɨt͡sɛ] is a village in the administrative district of Gmina Września, within Września County, Greater Poland Voivodeship, in west-central Poland.
