= Walga village =

Walga
- Village
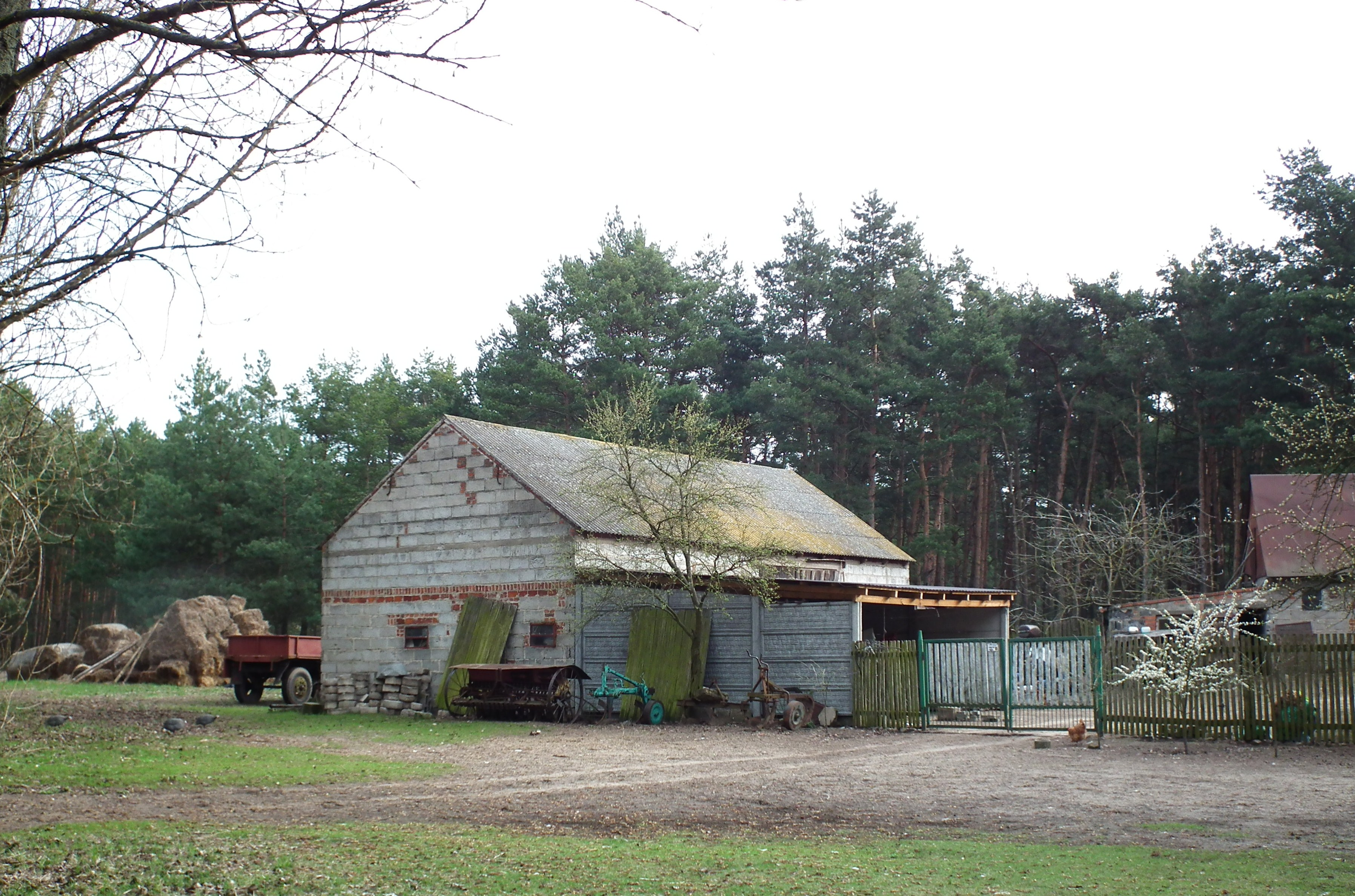

- Location within Poland
- Coordinates: 52°09′58″N 17°43′11″E
- Country: Poland
- Voivodeship: Greater Poland
- County: Września
- Gmina: Pyzdry

Walga [ˈvalɡa] is a village in the administrative district of Gmina Pyzdry, within Września County, Greater Poland Voivodeship, in west-central Poland.
