= Rayakoski =

Rayakoski Раякоски
- Inhabited locality
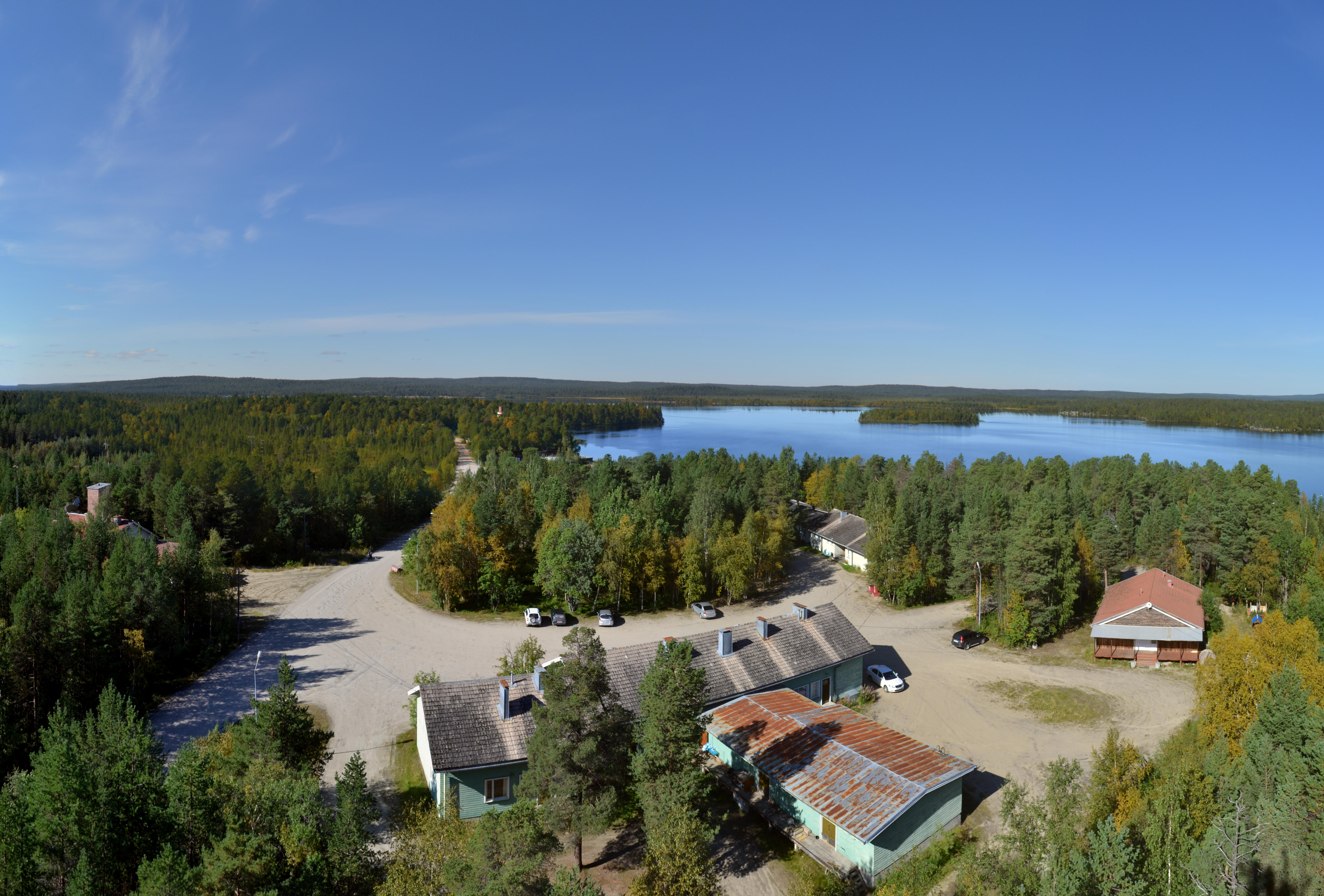

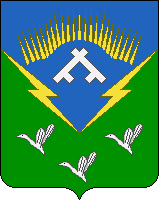
- Coat of arms
- Interactive map of Rayakoski
- Location of Rayakoski Rayakoski (Murmansk Oblast)
- Coordinates: 69°01′07″N 29°00′00″E
- Country: Russia
- Federal subject: Murmansk Oblast
- Administrative district: Pechengsky District

Population (2010 Census)
  - Total: 238
  - Estimate (2021): 169 (−29%)

Municipal status
  - Municipal district: Pechengsky Municipal District
  - Urban settlement: Nikel Urban Settlement
- Time zone: UTC+3 (MSK)
- Postal code: 184404
- Dialing code: +7 81554
- OKTMO ID: 47615151111

Rayakoski (Russian: Раякоски; Finnish: Rajakoski, Norwegian: Grensefoss; the Finnish and Norwegian name means border rapids, while the Russian name is borrowed) is a rural locality (an inhabited locality) in Pechengsky District of Murmansk Oblast, Russia, located adjacent to the tripoint between Finland, Norway, and Russia. Population: 238 (2010 Census).

== Overview ==
The settlement of Rayakoski emerged during the construction of the Rayakoski Hydroelectric Power Plant in 1955 and 1956. The Muotkavaara border tripoint between Russia, Finland and Norway is located nearby.
