= Pyzdry =

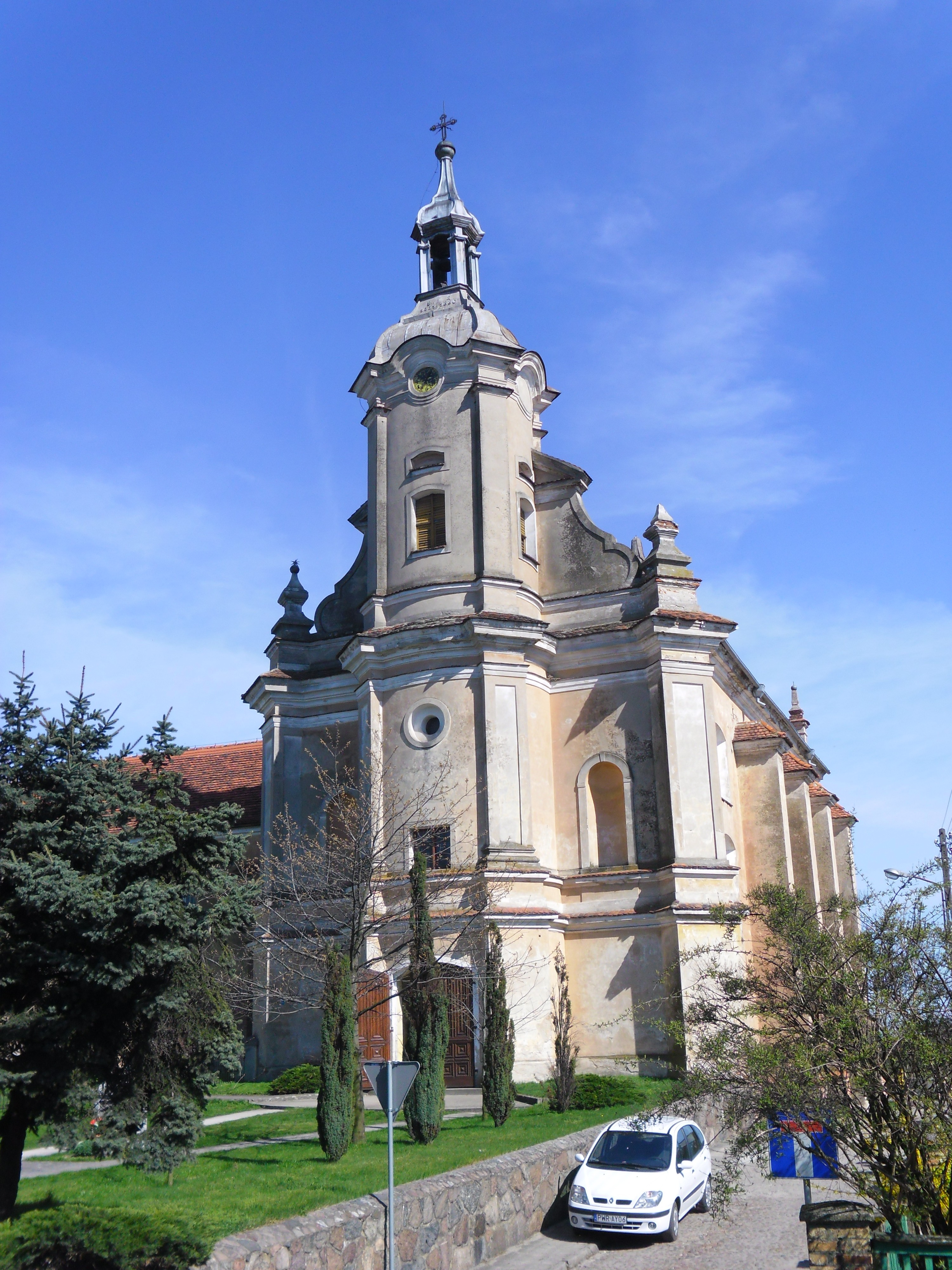
- Franciscan Church of the Beheading of St. John the Baptist

- Coat of arms

- Location within Poland
- Coordinates: 52°10′N 17°41′E
- Country: Poland
- Voivodeship: Greater Poland
- County: Września
- Gmina: Pyzdry
- First mentioned: 1232
- Town rights: before 1257

Area
  - Total: 12.16 km^{2} (4.70 sq mi)
- Elevation: 90 m (300 ft)

Population (2010)
  - Total: 3,228
  - Density: 265.5/km^{2} (687.5/sq mi)
- Time zone: UTC+1 (CET)
  - Summer (DST): UTC+2 (CEST)
- Postal code: 62-310
- Vehicle registration: PWR
- Website: http://www.pyzdry.pl/

Pyzdry ([ˈpɨzdrɨ]) (Yiddish: Payzer) is a town in Września County, Greater Poland Voivodeship, Poland, with 3,228 inhabitants (2010).

== History ==
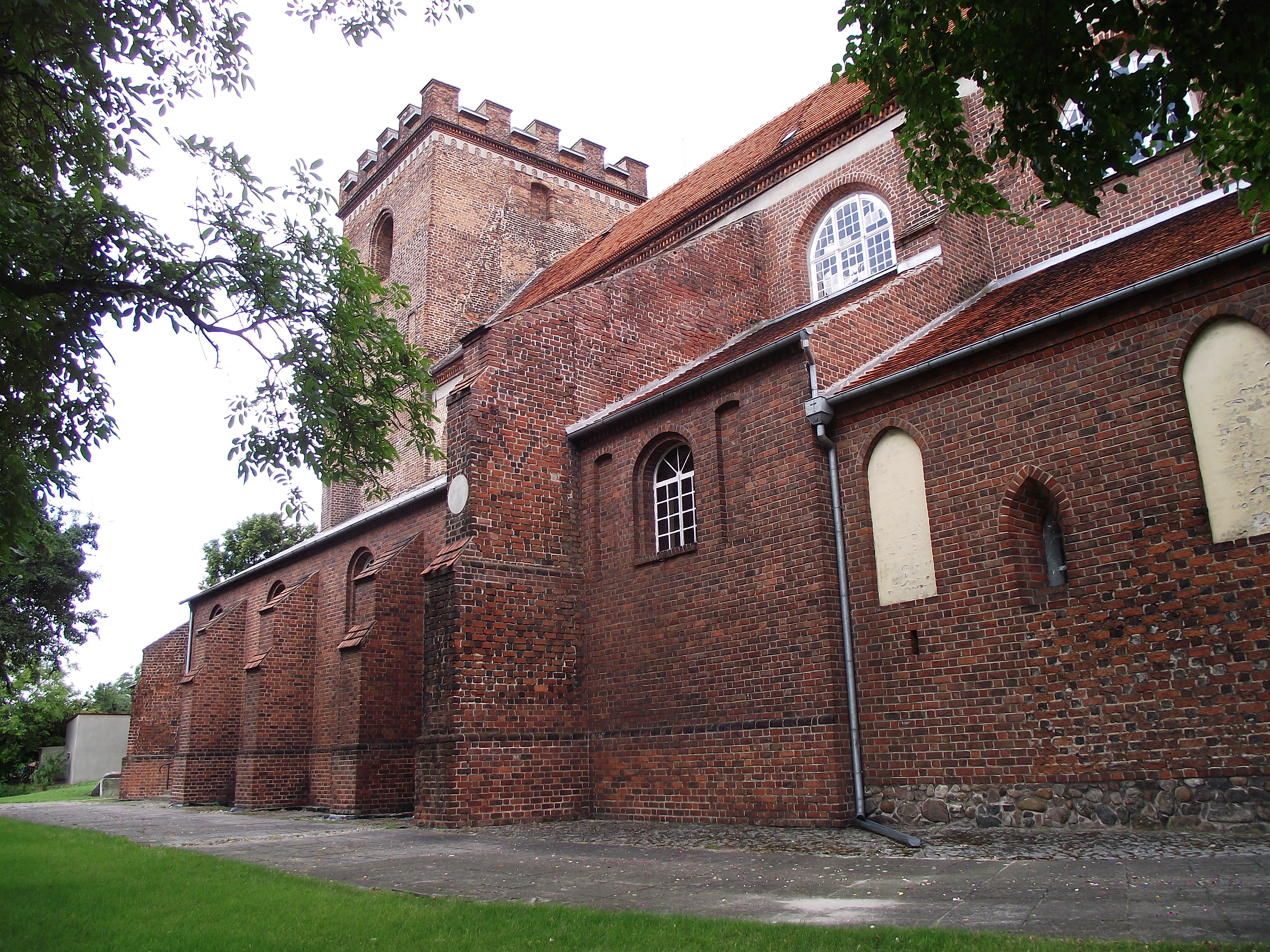
Medieval Saint Mary church

Pyzdry was first mentioned in 1232, when army of Silesian Piast Duke Henry I the Bearded entered Greater Poland. Pyzdry is one of the oldest town of the province, as in 1257 it was mentioned as a location governed by a vogt, which means that a well-established urban center must have already existed here. It is not known when Pyzdry received Magdeburg rights; most likely it happened during the reign of Duke Bolesław the Pious.

On 29 June 1318 Ladislaus the Short called at Pyzdry a meeting of Polish nobility and bishops, during which it was agreed that a delegation be sent to Pope John XXII, asking for his permission to grant Polish Crown to Ladislaus. In 1331, Pyzdry was burned to the ground by the Teutonic Knights in the Battle of Pyzdry. Following the destruction, King Casimir III of Poland ordered construction of a defensive wall with a mighty castle. In 1345, a truce between Casimir and John of Bohemia was signed here.

On 6 June 1346 Casimir presented at Pyzdry legal statutes for the province of Greater Poland. In 1390, King Władysław II Jagiełło met here with Wartislaw VII, Duke of Pomerania, who pledged vassalage to king of Poland. Pyzdry was a royal town and county seat, administratively located in the Kalisz Voivodeship in the Greater Poland Province of the Kingdom of Poland, and in 1562, it was named as the location of gatherings of pospolite ruszenie (levée en masse) for the Kalisz Voivodeship. The town was in 1655 captured and looted by Swedish soldiers (see Swedish invasion of Poland), and in 1704, a battle between supporters of Stanisław Leszczyński and Augustus II the Strong took place here. In 1768, Pyzdry burned in a great fire. The 1st Polish National Cavalry Brigade was stationed in the town.

Following the Second Partition of Poland, Pyzdry was annexed by the Kingdom of Prussia (1793). After the successful Greater Poland uprising of 1806, it was regained by Poles, and included within the newly established, however short-lived Duchy of Warsaw. Following the duchy's dissolution in 1815, it became part of Russian-controlled Congress Poland, in which it remained until World War I, and was the westernmost point of the Russian Empire. In 1818, Pyzdry County was disbanded. During the January Uprising, on 17 April 1863, the town was captured by Polish insurgents led by Edmund Taczanowski. On 29 April 1863 the Battle of Pyzdry was fought nearby, in which Polish insurgents led by Taczanowski defeated Russian troops. In 1867, as punishment for the January Uprising, Russians reduced Pyzdry to the status of a village. In 1918 Poland regained independence and control of Pyzdry, and in 1919 town rights were restored. According to the 1921 census, the town had a population of 4,614, 94.5% Polish, 3.9% Jewish and 1.5% German by declared nationality.

Following the joint German-Soviet invasion of Poland, which started World War II in September 1939, the town was occupied by Germany until 1945.

== Demographics ==
Historical population

Year	Pop.	±%
1890	5,115	—
1910	5,703	+11.5%
1921	4,614	−19.1%
1931	4,494	−2.6%

Year	Pop.	±%
1939	5,050	+12.4%
1950	3,197	−36.7%
1960	3,135	−1.9%
2010	3,228	+3.0%

== Sights ==
The town has several points of interest:

- historic urban center, which was shaped in the 14th century,
- parish church (built in mid-14th century, remodelled in the 15th century and in 1865–1870),
- Franciscan abbey (14th century),
- Baroque monastery (1690), located on the Warta river,
- ruins of a castle and defensive wall (early 14th century),
- houses from 18th and 19th centuries,

== Transport ==
Pyzdry lies at the intersection of voivodeship roads 466 and 442.

The nearest railway station is in Września.

== Notable people ==
Among people born here are Mikołaj of Pyzdry (rector of Jagiellonian University), writer Stefan Otwinowski and film director Ewa Petelska.
