= Gmina Września =

Gmina Września Września Municipality
- Gmina
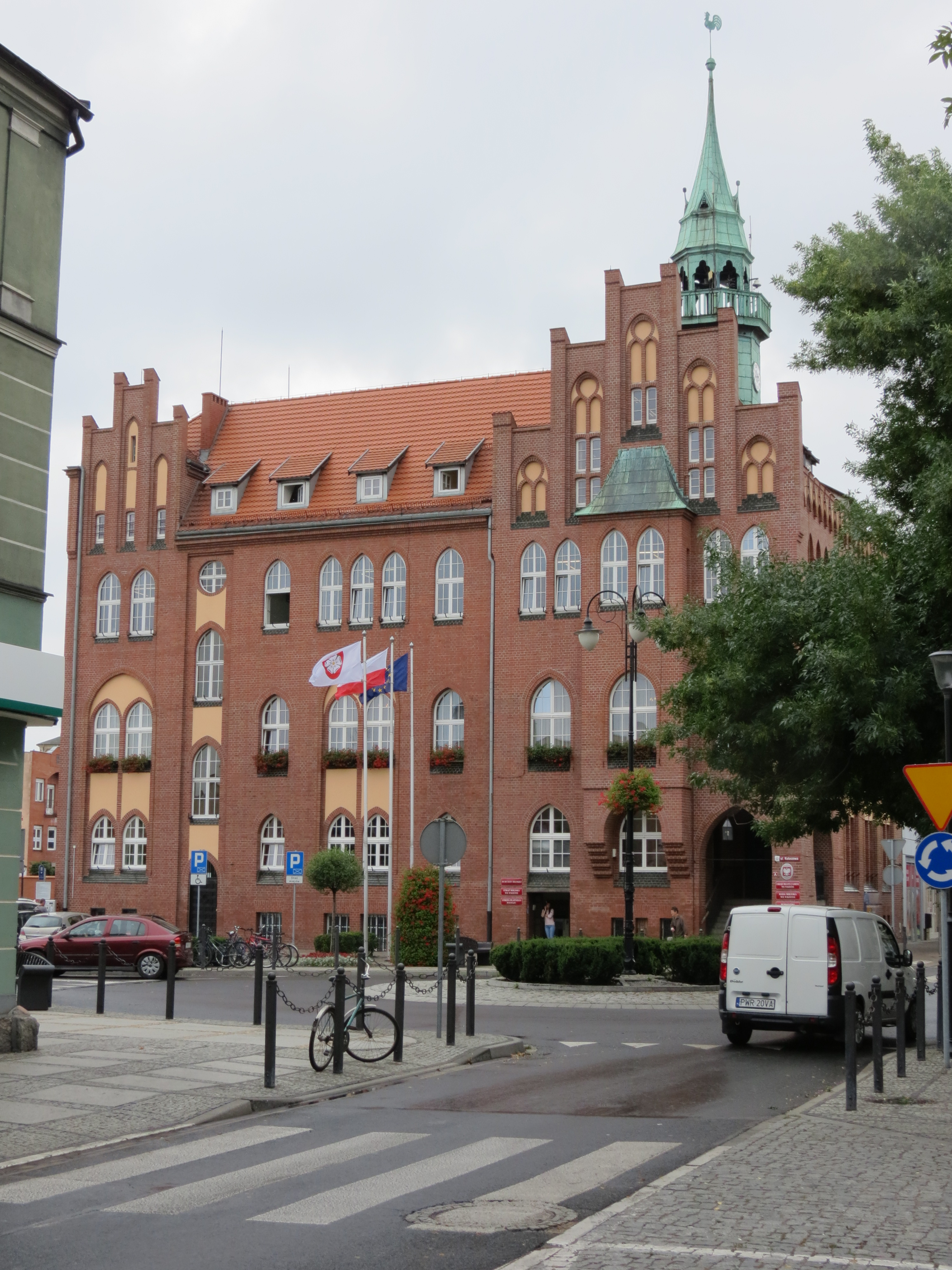
- Town Hall in Września, seat of the gmina office

- Coat of arms
- Interactive map of Gmina Września
- Coordinates (Września): 52°20′N 17°35′E
- Country: Poland
- Voivodeship: Greater Poland
- County: Września
- Seat: Września

Government
  - Mayor: Tomasz Kałużny

Area
  - Total: 221.84 km^{2} (85.65 sq mi)

Population (2012)
  - Total: 45,523
  - Density: 205.21/km^{2} (531.48/sq mi)
  - Urban: 29,564
  - Rural: 15,959
- Time zone: UTC+1 (CET)
  - Summer (DST): UTC+2 (CEST)
- Postal Code: 62-300
- Vehicle registration: PWR
- Contact: Urząd Miasta i Gminy we Wrześnii ul. Ratuszowa 1; 62-300 Września; Poland
- Website: www.wrzesnia.pl

Gmina Września is an urban-rural gmina (administrative district) in Września County, Greater Poland Voivodeship, in west-central Poland. Its seat is the town of Września, which lies approximately 46 kilometres (29 mi) east of the regional capital Poznań.

The gmina covers an area of 221.84 square kilometres (85.7 sq mi), and as of 2012 its total population is 45,523 (out of which the population of Września amounts to 29,564, and the population of the rural part of the gmina is 15,959).

== Villages ==
Apart from the town of Września, Gmina Września contains the villages and settlements of Bardo, Białężyce, Bierzglin, Bierzglinek, Broniszewo, Chocicza Mała, Chocicza Wielka, Chociczka, Chwalibogowo, Czachrowo, Dębina, Gonice, Goniczki, Gozdowo, Gozdowo-Młyn, Grzybowo, Grzymysławice, Gulczewko, Gulczewo, Gutowo Małe, Gutowo Wielkie, Kaczanowo, Kawęczyn, Kleparz, Marzelewo, Marzenin, Nadarzyce, Neryngowo, Noskowo, Nowa Wieś Królewska, Nowy Folwark, Obłaczkowo, Osowo, Ostrowo Szlacheckie, Otoczna, Przyborki, Psary Małe, Psary Polskie, Psary Wielkie, Radomice, Sędziwojewo, Słomówko, Słomowo, Sobiesiernie, Sokołówko, Sokołowo, Sołeczno, Stanisławowo, Strzyżewo, Węgierki, Wódki and Żerniki.

== Neighbouring gminas ==
Gmina Września is bordered by the gminas of Czerniejewo, Dominowo, Kołaczkowo, Miłosław, Nekla, Niechanowo, Strzałkowo and Witkowo.

== Demographics ==
According to the 2012 Census:

| Description | Total | | Women | | Men | |
|---|---|---|---|---|---|---|
| | People | % | People | % | People | % |
| Population | 45,523 | 100 | 22,086 | 48.5 | 23,437 | 51.5 |
