= Battle of Pyzdry (1863) =

- Part of the January Uprising
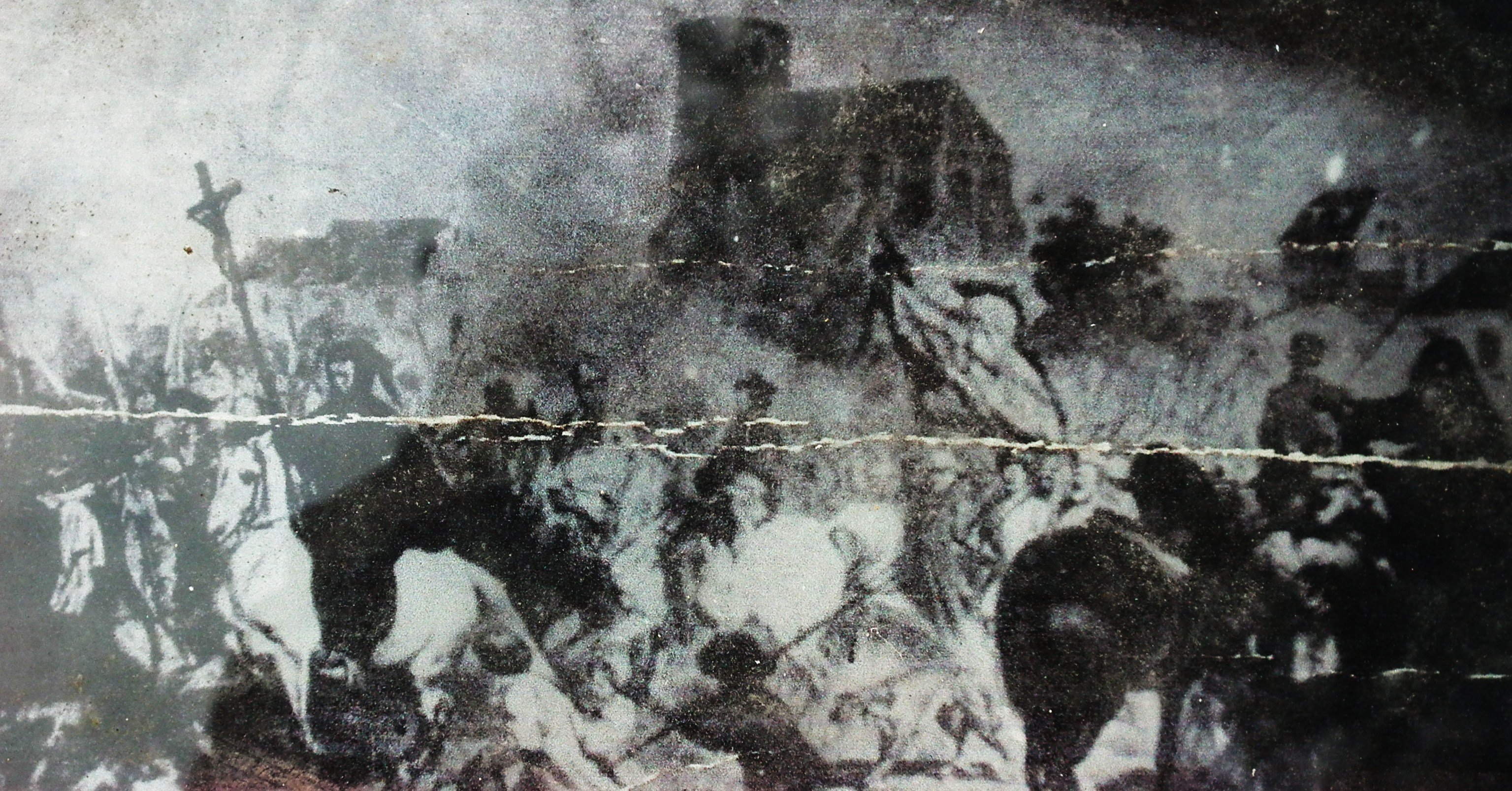
- Polish insurgents departing from Pyzdry to the battle on a painting by Wojciech Kossak
| Date | 29 April 1863 |
| Location | near Pyzdry 52°10′13″N 17°41′24″E |
| Result | Polish victory |

Belligerents
| (Poland) Polish insurgents | Russian Empire |

Commanders and leaders
| Edmund Taczanowski | |

Strength
| 1,200 | 1,500 |

Casualties and losses
| 8 dead and 27 wounded | Around 100 dead and wounded |
- Location within Poland

The Battle of Pyzdry, one of many skirmishes of the January Uprising, took place on April 29, 1863, near the town of Pyzdry, which at that time belonged to Russian-controlled Congress Poland. 1,200 Polish insurgents under Edmund Taczanowski and Alojzy Oranowski clashed here with 1,500 soldiers of the Imperial Russian Army. The battle ended in Polish victory.

== Background ==
Pyzdry, a town in historic Greater Poland, was at that time located in western part of Congress Poland, near the border with the Province of Posen in the Prussian Partition of Poland. The uprising did not reach this part of Prussia, but Poznań, where Poles were in the majority, supported the uprising with volunteers, weapons, money, uniforms and equipment.

Colonel Edmund Taczanowski, himself a resident of Province of Posen and former soldier of the Prussian Army, organized a rebel unit near Pleszew, and crossed the border into Congress Poland. On April 17, 1863, Taczanowski captured Pyzdry, the westernmost town of the Russian Empire, and forced Russian border guards into his unit.

== The battle ==
On April 28 in the evening, Taczanowski received news that the Russians, stationed in Konin were preparing an attack. He decided to face them, and sent for reinforcements, which camped in the village of Rataje under the command of French officer Émile Faucheux, a volunteer participant in the uprising. The Polish column then left Pyzdry, and in the morning of April 29, the insurgents were attacked. The battle lasted for eight hours, ending with a scythemen charge, which broke through Russian lines, and the enemy retreated.

== Aftermath ==
The victory made Taczanowski a hero. He was quickly promoted to general, but realizing that the Russians would attack again, with stronger forces, Taczanowski ordered his party to march towards Chocz, where on May 1, a smaller Russian unit was destroyed. On May 6, the insurgents defended the town of Koło, and a few days later, they lost the First Battle of Ignacewo.

== Sources ==
- Stefan Kieniewicz: Powstanie styczniowe. Warszawa: Państwowe Wydawnictwo Naukowe, 1983. ISBN 83-01-03652-4.
