= Battle of Pyzdry (1331) =

1331 battle

- Part of Polish–Teutonic War (1326–32)
Date	27 July 1331
Location	Pyzdry
Result	Teutonic victory

Belligerents
Teutonic Knights	Kingdom of Poland

Commanders and leaders
Dietrich von Altenburg; Otto von Lauterberg	Vincent of Szamotuł

The Battle of Pyzdry took place on 27 July 1331 between the Teutonic Order led by Dietrich von Altenburg and the Kingdom of Poland.

On 22 July 1331, Teutonic forces crossed the Vistula at Wyszogród and ravaged through Bydgoszcz, Inowrocław, and Słupca, reaching Pyzdry on 27 July. The city was captured in the absence of Prince Casimir as the future king had been evacuated, leaving the troops in Pyzdry led by the governor of Poznań Vincent of Szamotuł. Pyzdry was captured, looted and burned. Polish forces were too weak to break the branches of the Teutonic Knights and after incurring severe losses withdrew west in the direction of Poznań.
