= Września County =

Września County Powiat wrzesiński
- County
- Flag Coat of arms

- Location within the voivodeship
- Coordinates (Września): 52°20′N 17°35′E
- Country: Poland
- Voivodeship: Greater Poland
- Seat: Września
- Gminas: Total 5: Gmina Kołaczkowo; Gmina Miłosław; Gmina Nekla; Gmina Pyzdry; Gmina Września

Area
  - Total: 704.19 km^{2} (271.89 sq mi)

Population (2012)
  - Total: 76,453
  - Density: 108.57/km^{2} (281.19/sq mi)
  - Rural: 36,408
  - Urban-Rural: 40,045
- Postal Code: 62-300
- Car plates: PWR
- District Office: Powiat Wrzesiński ul. Chopin's 10; 62-300 Września; Poland
- Website: www.wrzesnia.powiat.pl

Września County (Polish: powiat wrzesiński) is a unit of territorial administration and local government (powiat) in Greater Poland Voivodeship, west-central Poland. It came into being on January 1, 1999, as a result of the Polish local government reforms passed in 1998. Its administrative seat and largest town is Września; the county is administered from the district office building.

The county covers an area of 704.19 square kilometres (271.9 sq mi). As of 2012 its total population is 76,453.

== Neighbouring counties ==
Września County is bordered by Gniezno County to the north, Słupca County to the east, Pleszew County and Jarocin County to the south, and Środa County and Poznań County to the west.

== Administrative divisions ==
The county is subdivided into five gminas (four urban-rural and one rural). These are listed in the following table, in descending order of population.

Gmina	Type	Area (km^{2})	Population (2006)	Seat
Gmina Września	urban-rural	221.8	45,523	Września
Gmina Miłosław	urban-rural	132.3	10,385	Miłosław
Gmina Pyzdry	urban-rural	137.9	7,240	Pyzdry
Gmina Nekla	urban-rural	96.2	7,191	Nekla
Gmina Kołaczkowo	rural	116.0	6,114	Kołaczkowo
