= Stefan Cybichowski =

Polish architect and social activist (1881–1940)

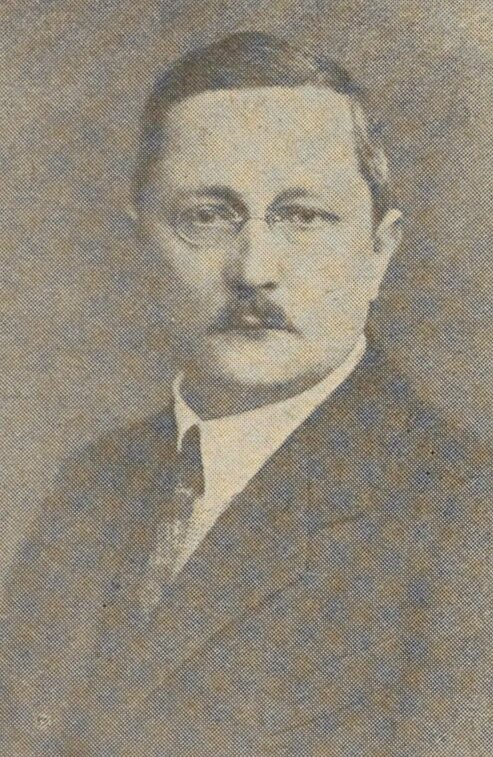
- Picture of Stefan Cybichowski before 1929
- Born: 2 August 1881; Poznań, German Empire
- Died: 6 January 1940 (aged 58); Poznań, Poland
- Education: Berlin Royal Technische Hochschule
- Occupations: architect, social activist
- Spouse: Barbara Mieczkowska
- Children: Helena, Irena, Stanisław, Barbara, Katarzyna
- Parent(s): Bronisław Cybichowski and Marta née Bischoff

Signature
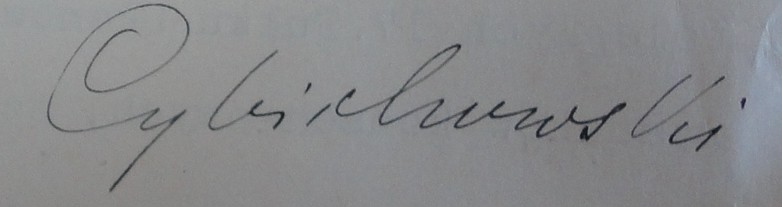

Stefan Cybichowski (1881 –1940) was a Polish architect and a social activist. He was one of the most versatile artists in the architecture of Greater Poland in the interwar period, both in terms of style and functional diversity of his buildings.

== Life ==
=== Early years ===
Stefan Cybichowski was born on 2 August 1881 in Poznań (then Posen) to Maria Marta Bischoff and Bronisław Bernard Cybichowski (1844–1903), a philosopher and a philologist. Following the Kulturkampf strict policies, the family had to transfer to Inowrocław in April 1882 and later to Münster, Westphalia on 1 November 1887. They only returned to Inowrocław in 1892.

In 1901, Cybichowski graduated from the German Royal Gymnasium in Inowrocław, today's Secondary School - Jan Kasprowicz (I Liceum Ogólnokształcące im. Jana Kasprowicza w Inowrocławiu).

As most of the architects from Greater Poland at that time, he studied architecture at a German university. In his case, he went to the Berlin Royal Technische Hochschule of Charlottenburg, graduating in 1905.

=== Berlin (1906–1910) ===
With his diploma, Cybichowski started to work on different projects in Berlin (1906-1909):

- Building of the Royal School of Art;
- Expansion and reconstruction of the Royal Mint house.

In parallel, between 1907 and 1909, he became a lecturer at the Industrial Academy in Berlin, where he gave a lecture entitled "Building Design". In 1910, he received the qualifications of Notary builder.

Under his supervision, Cybichowski designed in the German capital many edifices, from churches, theatres, gymnasiums to primary schools and infirmaries.

During this period, he won awards in competitions for the chapel at Morskie Oko and the town hall of Spandau.

In 1909–1910, he co-designed the project for the construction of the Fasanenstrasse Synagogue in Charlottenburg.

=== Poznań (1910–1939) ===
At the end of 1910, Cybichowski moved to Poznań: there, he opened his own architectural office. In 1912, he became a member of the newly created (1911) Technical Department of the Poznań Society for the Advancement of Arts and Sciences (Poznańskie Towarzystwo Przyjaciół Nauk).

In 1911, he gave a lecture On the use of gypsum in construction and, on 20 January 1914, a lecture about quadrangles. From 1920 to 1926, he lectured on rural architecture at the Faculty of Agriculture and Forestry of Adam Mickiewicz University in Poznań.

At the end of 1918, Cybichowski became the first president of the Architects' Circle of the Poznań Association of Technicians, the local branch of the national Association of Polish Architects. He stayed its president until 6 July 1925, replaced in the position by urbanist Marian Antoni Pospieszalski. He joined the circle at national level (Stowarzyszenie Inżynierów i Architektów) three years later.

In 1924, Cybichowski won the competition organized in the perspective of the 1929 Polish General Exhibition in Poznań (PeWuKa: Powszechna Wystawa Krajowa w Poznaniu). As such, he designed the entire building ensemble of the 65-hectare (160-acre) plot.

==== Activism ====
Between 1919 and 1922, Cybichowski was at the head of the construction department at the Voivodeship Office. There, he carried out the polonization of the administration. As such, he was one of the organizers of the first Poznań Trade Fair (Targ Poznański) from 28 May to 5 June 1921.

He was a member of the Poznań City Council (1919–1925), but resigned from the seat in 1922. Later (1927–1931), Cybichowski was an honorary councilor of the "Magistrat of the city of Poznań".

Furthermore, he belonged to the Association of Artists in Poznań from 1911. He was also a member of the Society of Friends of the City of Poznań (Towarzystwo Miłośników Miasta Poznań im. Cyryl Ratajski).

=== Death ===
On 28 October 1939, the Poznań Gestapo arrested Cybichowski, together with a group of professors, as part of the Intelligenzaktion. They were imprisoned in the Fort VII camp. Cybichowski was shot there on 6 January 1940.

His family was not informed about his execution until after the end of the conflict. A symbolic grave is located at the Parish Cemetery of Saint John Vianney in Poznań.

For many years, Cybichowski's private archive was believed to be lost. In 1998, though, thanks to an employee of the Office of the Municipal Conservator of Monuments in Poznań, the architect's daughter, Helena Cybichowska, donated building designs and documentation about her father's projects in Poznań, Wielkopolska and Kujavia-Pomerania to the collections of the Municipal Conservator of Monuments.

== Family ==
On 25 June 1912, Cybichowski married Barbara Aniela Mieczkowska h. Bończa. They had five children:

- Stefan Cybichowski and Barbara Cybichowska (1888 - 1981)
  - Stanisław Marian (1918–2015) married Doris (1912–2007)
    - Teresa Barbara Cybichowska (born 1954)
    - Stefan Ernest Cybichowski (born 1959)
  - Helena Bronisława Cybichowska (1913 - 1998) married Edmund Kasperski (1912–2007)
    - Zbigniew Kasperski (born 1955)
  - Irena Maria Cybichowska (1916 – ca 2000) married Sixten Ydefeldt (born 1910)
  - Barbara Marta Cybichowska (1919 – ca 2005)
  - Katarzyna Cybichowska (1925 - 2014) married Stanisław Bolewski h. Łodzia (1918–1988)
    - Jacek Bolewski h. Łodzia (1946 – 2012), jesuit priest
    - Anna Bolewska h. Łodzia (born 1947) married Julian Skiendzielewski (born 1950), three children
    - Krystyna Bolewska h. Łodzia (born 1949)
    - Tadeusz Bolewski h. Łodzia (born 1951 - 2024) married Anna Oświecimska (born 1952), four children
    - Piotr Bolewski h. Łodzia (born 1953)

== Realizations ==
Cybichowski's favorite style often referred to neo-classicist forms, as it was the trend in the first decade of the Second Polish Republic. He sometimes used Neo-Baroque style.

Cybichowski can undoubtedly be called the most versatile architect in Greater Poland between 1909 and the start of World War II. He played an important role in the process of rehabilitating village churches to social demographic conditions, by and large redefining the image of provincial sacral architecture. Stylistically, he was an architect bridging two periods, historicizing forms and modernism, which was first introduced by him into the sacral architectural of large city churches in the region (Poznań, Bydgoszcz, Inowrocław).

The identified legacy of Cybichowski includes completed works and designs, in particular approximately 100 religious edifices. For this endeavour, he was given the title of papal chamberlain. His work is characterized by stylistic diversity, from Neo-Baroque to Neo-Renaissance, from Neoclassicism to Eclecticism and Modern Architecture.

=== Poznań ===
Year	Edifice	Remarks	Picture
1924-1929	International Fair complex	Design of the administrative building (pavilion 101) and the Fair Palace (pavilion 12).	
1927	Palm House in the Wilson park.	Nonexistent and replaced by a larger building. Only the grand entry gate remains.	
1927-1929	Municipal School of Commerce	At today 54 Śniadeckich street.	
1928–1930 and 1936–37	Saint Stanislaus Kostka church	Registered on the cultural heritage registry of the Greater Poland Voivodeship (number A 277).	
1927	Carmelites monastery on Jarochowskiego street	Today the Holy Family Hospital of Gynecology and Obstetrics.	
1928	Reconstruction of the Polish Theatre	Drama theatre operating in the centre of Poznań since 1875.	
1897-1920	Building of the Bank Włościański	Located at 9 Plac Wolności.	
1928	Pebeco factory on Główna Street	Today Nivea Polska factory.	
1939	Dominican Friars monastery	Located at 9 Plac Wolności.	
1933-1934	Mieloch Family Mausoleum	The coffins were moved to the cemetery in Junikowo, a suburb of Poznań. Since the 1990s, the area has been the property of the family of the former owners.	

=== Vicinity of Poznań ===
Year	Edifice	Remarks	Picture
1934-1935	Sacred Heart and Saint Anne church in Kiszewo	It was consecrated in 1935.	
1924-1925	Saint Nicholas church in Ryczywół	Built on the site of an older wooden church, the tower is 39 metres (128 ft) tall.	
1927	Saint Martin of Tours church in Kuczków	The preceding wooden church on the site burned down after being struck by lightning.	
1927-1929	Church of St. James the Greater in Sokolniki	Registered on the cultural heritage registry of the Greater Poland Voivodeship (number 38/Wlkp/A).	
1928-1930	Christ the King church in Jarocin	During the Nazi occupation, the Germans converted the church into a furniture warehouse.	
1912	Saint Margaret church in Cielcza	The church, built on the plan of a Greek cross, was consecrated by Edward Likowski, Bishop of Poznań, on 16 November 1913.	
1934-1935	Saint Nicholas Church in Wszembórz	In 1941, the church was converted into a car repair shop by the Germans. The edifice can accommodate about 1,000 worshippers.	
1914-1916	Palace in Bieganowo	Bieganowo had been owned by the Grzymalita Bieganowski family since the 18th century.	

=== Bydgoszcz and vicinity ===
Year	Edifice	Remarks	Picture
1926-1929	Saint Therese of the Child Jesus church in Kruszwica	Registered on the cultural heritage list of the Kuyavian-Pomeranian Voivodeship (number A/1526).	
1926-1928	Church of Our Lady of Perpetual Help	Originally, timber framing technique was supposed to be used, but following Poznań architect Stefan Cybichowski's advice, it was decided to build a reinforced concrete nave and enlarge the church by one span.	
1927	Reconstruction of the 1850s manor in Chwaliszewo	Registered on the cultural heritage registry of the Kuyavian-Pomeranian Voivodeship (number 187/A).	
1927-1928	Catholic House in Bydgoszcz	Registered on the cultural heritage list of the Kuyavian-Pomeranian Voivodeship (number A/1266).	
Design in 1923, building in 1927-1933	Extension and Neo-Baroque re-designing of Saint Nicholas church in Fordon	Registered on the cultural heritage registry of the Kuyavian-Pomeranian Voivodeship (number A/424/1).	
1928-1931	Christ the King church in Jeleńcz	The previous wooden church hab been built in 1767, but a storm toppled its tower on 19 June 1871.	
1934-1935	Saint Joseph church in Inowrocław	Registered on the cultural heritage list of the Kuyavian-Pomeranian Voivodeship (number A/1591).	
1935	Saint Anthony of Padua Church	Thanks to Father Polzin, the unfinished church was leased during WWII to a German company for storing there construction tools, hence saving the future edifice.	
1935	Church of the Blessed Virgin Mary Queen of Poland in Brzoza	The location chosen for the new church was the very place where in January 1919 fightings took place during the Greater Poland Uprising	

=== Gniezno and vicinity ===
Year	Edifice	Remarks	Picture
1937-1939	Church of the Blessed Virgin Mary of Perpetual Help in Zdziechowa	It was erected as a votive offering for the victory in the Greater Poland Uprising and the regaining of Polish independence.	
1935	Renovation of the cathedral, the suffragan house and the Primate's Higher Seminary (1935);	For the seminary, works comprised the addition of two floors and wings.	
1934	Saint Dorothy church in Strzałkowo	Dipslaying neoclassical style, the edifice characterized by a large dome.	

=== Toruń and vicinity ===
Year	Edifice	Remarks	Picture
1927-1930	Minor seminary and Redemptorists monastery	The projects were financially supported by Redemptorist followers and American and Dutch Redemptorists.	
1927	Chapel of Our Lady of Częstochowa in Chełmża.	In 1940, the chapel was destroyed by the German forces.	

=== Other places ===
Year	Edifice	Remarks	Picture
1929	Saint Joseph church in Tczew	The brick tower is 48 metres (157 ft) tall.	
1934	Reconstruction of the St. Michael the Archangel in Łomża	The works followed the raising of the church to the rank of the cathedral of the Łomża diocese on 28 October 1925.	
1930-1934	Saint Lawrence church in Gołańcz	The church can accommodate up to 5,000 worshippers.	
1929	Saint James the Great church in Lubichowo	The neo-Baroque church houses older furnishings from the two earlier wooden churches.	
1931-1933	Corpus Christi church in Hel	During the occupation, German soldiers used the church as a warehouse, a cinema hall and a dormitory.	
1926	Tombstone of Father Piotr Wawrzyniak in Mogilno (1926);	The tombstone was consecrated on 10 November 1913, on the third anniversary of the death of Father Piotr Wawrzyniak, a great advocate of Polishness, deputy to the Prussian Sejm in Berlin (1894 - 1898) and priest of the Mogilno parish church.	
1923-1924	Insurgents' mausoleum in Trzemeszno	The monument was destroyed by the Nazis in the autumn of 1939. It was reconstructed according to the design of Andrzej Chodnik (reduced by one third) and unveiled on 28 December 2008.	
1933	Saint Nicholas church in Niedamowo	Three churches (ca 1282, 1649, 1820) preceded the current one.	

== See also ==
- Bydgoszcz Architects (1850–1970s)
- List of Polish artists

== Bibliography ==
- Białkiewicz, Joanna Jadwiga (December 2015). Stefan Cybichowski, jego twórczość ne tle epoki [Stefan Cybichowski, his works against the background of the era] (PDF) (in Polish). Kraków: Politechnika Krakowska im. Tadeusza Kóściuszki. Wydział Architektury. Instytut Historii architektury i konserwacji zabytków. p. 3.
- Rutowska, Maria (1984). Straty osobowe i materialne kultury w Wielkopolsce w latach II wojny światowej [Human and material losses of culture in Greater Poland during World War II] (in Polish). Warszawa – Poznań: Państwowe Wydawnictwo Naukowe. ISBN 83-01-04801-8.
- Zeszyty Architektury Polskiej. dwumiesięcznik. Nr4-5 [Polish Architecture Notebooks. Bimonthly. nr 4-5] (in Polish). Warszawa: Zarząd Główny Stowarzyszenia Architektów Polskich. 1986.
- Czarnecki, Władysław (1987). To był też mój Poznań. Wspomnienia architekta miejskiego z lat 1925-1939 [This was also my Poznań. Memories of a city architect from 1925-1939] (in Polish). Poznań: Poznańskie. ISBN 83-210-0665-5.
- Rutowska, Maria; Serwański, Edward (1987). Losy polskich środowisk artystycznych w latach 1939–1945. Architektura, sztuki plastyczne, muzyka i teatr. Problemy metodologiczne strat osobowych [The fate of Polish artistic circles in the years 1939–1945. Architecture, visual arts, music and theatre. Methodological problems of personal losses] (in Polish). Poznań: Instytut Zachodni. ISBN 83-85003-09-6.
- Kondziela, Henryk (2000). Polski słownik biograficzny konserwatorów zabytków, z. 1 [Polish biographical dictionary of monument conservators, no. 1] (in Polish). Poznań: Stowarzyszenie Konserwatorów Zabytków. ISBN 83-900862-7-1.
- Burno, Filip (2005). Kościoły rzymskokatolickie kresów II Rzeczypospolitej i ich znaczenie, "Kwartalnik Architektury i Urbanistyki" T.50 [Roman Catholic Churches of the Borderlands of the Second Polish Republic and Their Significance. "Architecture and Urban Planning Quarterly" T.50] (in Polish). Warszawa: Polska Akademia Nauk. pp. 115–140.
- Pazder, Janusz (2008). Atlas architektury Poznania [Architecture Atlas of Poznań] (in Polish). Poznań: Miejskie. ISBN 978-83-7503-058-7.
