= Bronisław Kłobucki =

Polish sculptor, 20th century

- Born: 21 June 1896; Bromberg, German Empire
- Died: 22 September 1944 (aged 48); Battle of Arnhem, Netherlands
- Known for: Sculpture
- Style: Realism, Symbolism

Bronisław Kłobucki (1896–1944), was a Polish sculptor and painter whose works are associated with Bydgoszcz and its region.

== Biography ==
=== Youth in Prussian Bromberg ===
His parents were Stanisław and Marcjanna, née Strysik. They moved to Bydgoszcz in 1894, coming from the village of Taszewskie Pole, near Jeżewo (Świecie county), as the father, a master carpenter, found work in the locally well-known furniture factory of Otto Pfefferkon, then located in Bahnhoffstraße.

Little is known about the artist's early youth. In 1910, he graduated from the "Folk School" (Polish: Szkoła ludowa) in Szwederowo.

=== First World War ===
During First World War, Bronisław was drafted into the German army: in 1915, he fought on the western front.

In the spring of 1918, he fled to France and joined the nascent Polish army. He returned to Poland in the ranks of General Józef Haller's "Blue Army".

=== Interwar period ===
Released from the army, Bronisław began in 1921 his artistic education at the State School of Art Industry in Bydgoszcz, at 37 Świętej Trójcy street, where he studied sculpture in the class of professors Jan Wysocki and Feliks Giecewicz.

In this place, Kłobucki rubbed elbows with students like Teodor Gajewski, Piotr Triebler, Stefan Kiersnowski or Zygmunt Kowalewski.

After graduation, Bronisław Kłobucki stayed in Bydgoszcz as registered in the 1926 city address book ("student, at 43 Nowodworska street") or in the 1933 issue ("Artist sculptor at 50 Gdańska Street"). The latter was the location of his second studio.

In 1928, he participated on his first salon, the "Exhibition of paintings, sculptures and graphics by artists from Nadnotecia and Pomerania" (Polish: "Wystawa obrazów, rzeźb i grafiki artystów Nadnotecia i Pomorza") at the Municipal Museum, together with Piotr Triebler, Stanisław Teodor Wachowicz, Antoni Olejnik and Ignacy Zelek from Toruń.

From 1929, the sculptor belonged to the "Association of Artists in Bydgoszcz" (Polish: Związek Artystów Plastyków w Bydgoszczy), renamed "Association of Pomeranian Artists" on 24 October 1929.

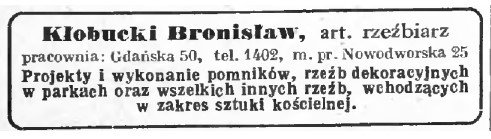
Advertising for Klobucki studio in 1933

At the 1930 annual "Exhibition of paintings and sculptures of the Association of Pomeranian Artists", Bronisław Kłobucki was a member of the jury, along with his colleagues Triebler, Gajewski or painters Karol Mondral and Jerzy Rupniewski. In November 1931, he moved his workshop at 50 Gdańska street, where was housed the Polish Club.

In 1930, Kłobucki realized sculptures for the decoration of the Botanic Garden of Bydgoszcz which opened in August 1930:

- An allegoric ensemble, called The four parts of the year, depicting the four seasons. They have been lost when the new botanic garden at Myślęcinek opened in 1979. Thanks to sponsoring efforts (Ewa Taterczynska Foundation and Bydgoszcz Pomeranian Gas Company), the decorative works have been restored to their original shape and location;
- A relief map of Bydgoszcz in artificial stone, on the southern side of the Botanic Garden. The plan exposes rivers, valleys, hills, waters, railways, selected roads and buildings. The relief was accompanied by water fountains (lost today) and two stone benches with mascarons.

In the mid-1930s, the artist received more and more commissions from Bydgoszcz parishes.

In 1934, Kłobucki and his friends took part in the annual exhibition "Grupa Plastyk Pomorskich" (Pomeranian Plastics Group) realized at the Municipal Museum. The catalog of the exhibition mentions that Kłobucki presented there the following pieces, nowadays non-existent:

- "Biust Prezydenta Ignacego Mościckiego (plaster);
- "Marszałek Piłsudski" (wood);
- "Portret Ks. M" (gypsum);
- "Crucifix" (wood).

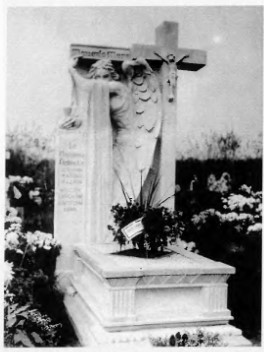
Tombstone of Marcjanna Klobucka, 1934

In 1935, Bronisław started one of his major woodcarving projects in cooperation with his brother Wacław. The resulting pieces of art are two neo-baroque side altars, designed by Marian Andrzejewski from Poznań. They were placed in the parish church of Our Lady of Perpetual Help in Szwederowo district, in the side aisles of the temple. Both altars are signed by the two artists/brothers.

In 1936, Kłobucki participated in the first "Bydgoski Salon", an annual exhibition of Bydgoszcz artists. He did so for the second edition a year later. Still in 1936, he realized several portraits of artists, friends and people associated with the cultural society: Kazimierz Południow (bust), the president of the Cultural and Artistic Council, Feliks Krassowski (head), a stage designer of the Municipal Theatre and Teodor Gajewski (head).

From this time on, he mainly carried out orders for parishes, municipal and private investors.

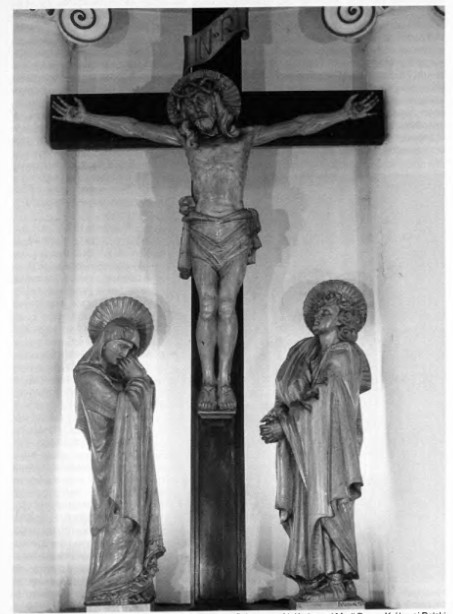
Crucifixion group, Church of the Virgin Mary Queen of Poland, Brzoza 1937

Before the outbreak of the Second World War, Bronisław focused his work on religious-themed projects for interior furnishings:

- A "Jubilee Cross" for the Church of the Holy Trinity in Bydgoszcz (1934). It is currently located on the northern wall of the nave of the church. The monumental cross is approx. 430 centimetres (14.1 ft) high, with life-size figures, made of polychrome wood. The work was founded by the "Brotherhood of the Living Rosary of Mothers" (Polish: Bractwo Żywego Różańca Matek) and consecrated on 18 November 1934.
- "Sacred Heart of Jesus", 1935, located on a square in Fordon. The chapel-monument, about 5 metres (16 ft) tall, was unveiled on 2 October 1935 by Bishop Stanisław Okoniewski. Destroyed in September 1939.
- A "Crucifixion Group" for the Church of the Virgin Mary Queen of Poland in Brzoza (1937). According to Henryk Kłobucki (the artist's nephew), the figures were part of an altar retable located originally in the Church of the Sacred Heart of Jesus in Bydgoszcz. The altar was then moved to Brzoza shortly after 1945.

In the context of the architectural reconstruction (1927–1933) of Saint Nicholas church of Fordon, Kłobucki realized:

- Two side altars with figures of saints, 1937–1939;
- A statue of Saint Thérèse, 1937;
- A pulpit with bas-reliefs portraying the Evangelists (lost) and a neo-baroque confessional (preserved) for Saint Nicolas church in Fordon.

=== World War II ===
During the occupation, Kłobucki was identified by Nazi authorities as an element of the 3rd category/"Eingedeutschte" or "Voluntarily Germanised". Any refusal to join this list often led to deportation to a concentration camp: as a consequence, he was drafted into the Wehrmacht.

He died on 22 September 1944, during the Battle of Arnhem.

=== Family ===
Marcjanna and Stanisław Kłobucki had five children: Wacław and Ludwik were born in Taszewskie Pole, while Bronisław, Józef and Wanda were born in Bydgoszcz.

- The eldest son Wacław, born in 1891, took over the carpentry profession after his father and worked, like him, in Otto Pfefferkon's factory. He collaborated with Bronisław in the late 1930s on woodcarving projects. During WWI, Wacław, as a Prussian citizen, fought in Warmia on the German side. He was wounded and lost one leg.
- Ludwik, the second eldest son, was born in 1893. He received a musical education and graduated from the Conservatory of Bromberg/Bydgoszcz. He was considered a very talented violinist and conductor. His salon orchestra enjoyed a relative popularity in the city. Ludwik had a son, Henryk.
- Józef, born in 1898, graduated as well from the Municipal Conservatory of Music and became a musician too. In 1939, he was mobilized and joined the "15th Greater Poland Light Artillery Regiment" (Polish: 15 Wielkopolski Pułk Artylerii Lekkiej) in Bydgoszcz. He died on 17 September 1939, at the Battle of the Bzura.
- Wanda, the youngest and only daughter, was born in 1909. She later worked in an office.

Bronisław did not marry and had no children.

== Works ==
Kłobucki's life and work were marked by the wars, especially the First World War. During several decades of activity, the artist has made over 50 sculptures. His most significant objects, monuments, religious figures and commemorative plaques were destroyed during WWII. The sculptures that survived warfare are often privately owned. Bydgoszcz museum collections hold very few of his works from the interwar period.

Bronisław Kłobucki's sculptural work is divided into chamber sculpture, monumental sculpture (sepulchral sculpture), outdoor sculpture, portraits and woodcarving for sacral interiors.

Other known works, mostly from exhibitions catalogs, documentation and reviews, are:

- "Starzec" ("The Old Man"), terracotta, probably from 1923.
- "Bust of Carl August Franke" (1927), commissioned by a private client. A plaster copy is exhibited at the Regional Museum in Bydgoszcz.
- Sculptures for a chapel of the Poor Clares' Church in Bydgoszcz, commemorating the fallen inhabitants of Bydgoszcz (1927). Non existent.

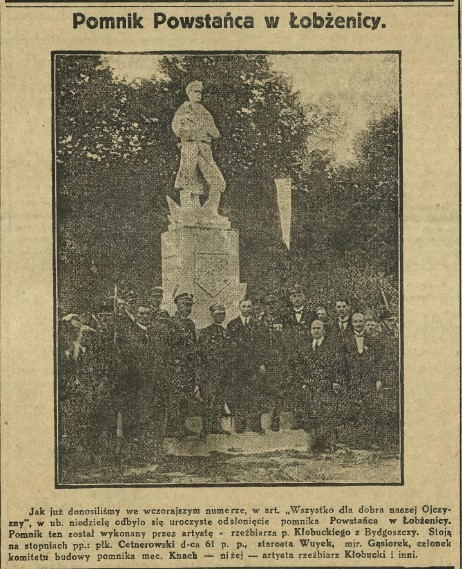
Article about the unveiling of the "Pomnik Powstańca" in Łobżenica

- "Lying lions" (1927) for a monument chapel to the soldiers fallen at the Battle of Brodnica against the Bolshevik forces on 18 August 1920. The chapel was located at the military cemetery of Brodnica.
- Neo-baroque ciborium (1928), placed in the church of Saint Nicholas in Fordon.
- "Monument to the Fallen on the Field of Glory 1918 – 1920" (1929). Erected in the courtyard of the barracks of the "61st Greater Poland Infantry Regiment" (Polish: 61 Pułk Piechoty) in Bydgoszcz. It was moved in 1933 to Polnocna Street, now Powstańców Warszawy street. Destroyed during WWII.
- An obelisk dedicated to the fallen soldiers of the "61 Pułk Piechoty" regiment (1929). Destroyed during WWII.
- "Pomnik Powstańca" (Monument to the Insurgent), (1929–1930). Unveiled 1 June 1930, it used to stand on the Old Market place (now Plac Wolności) of Łobżenica.
- "Oberek and Polonaise", 1930, (artificial stone). Outdoor figural works, life size, portraying Polish dances, which used to stand in a city garden of Bydgoszcz. Destroyed by the Germans in 1939. A copy of "Oberek" still exists.
- "Głowa ślepca", 1930 (wood).
- "Boy with a globe", 1932, placed in the garden of a school at 20 Świętojańska street. Destroyed in 1939.
- "Biust Marszałka Śmigłego Rydza" (plaster), "Portret księdza, dziekana G." (plaster), "Profil Chopina" (wood), all presented at a 1936 exhibition. Lost.
- "Portret Prezydenta Barciszewskiego" (gypsum), 1937. Lost.

== Gallery ==
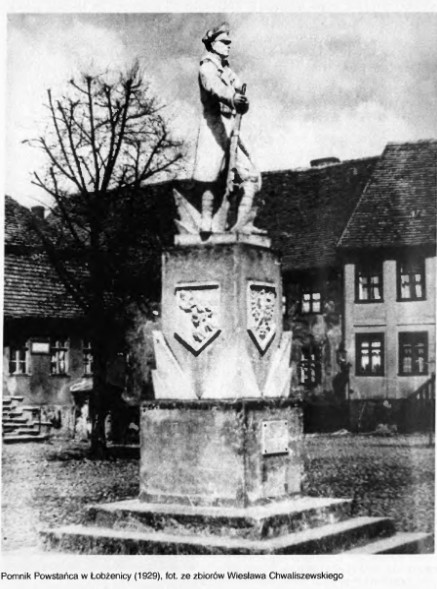
Monument to the insurgent, Łobżenica, 1929

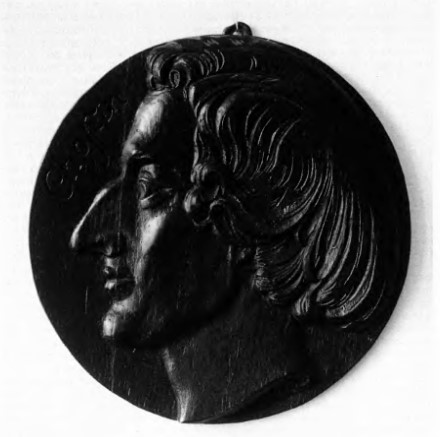
Profil of Chopin on a coin, 1936

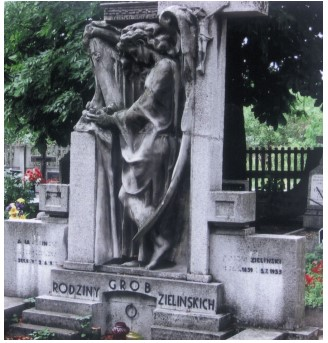
Tombstone of the Zielinski family, 1935n

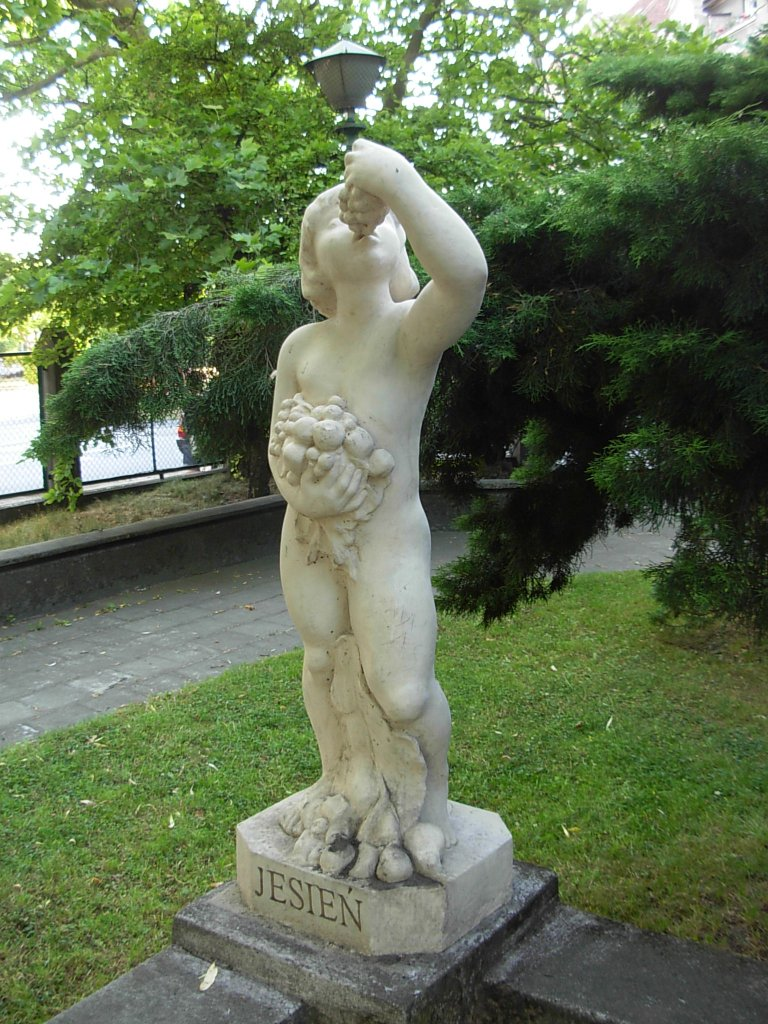
Allegory of Autumn, Botanic Garden, 1930

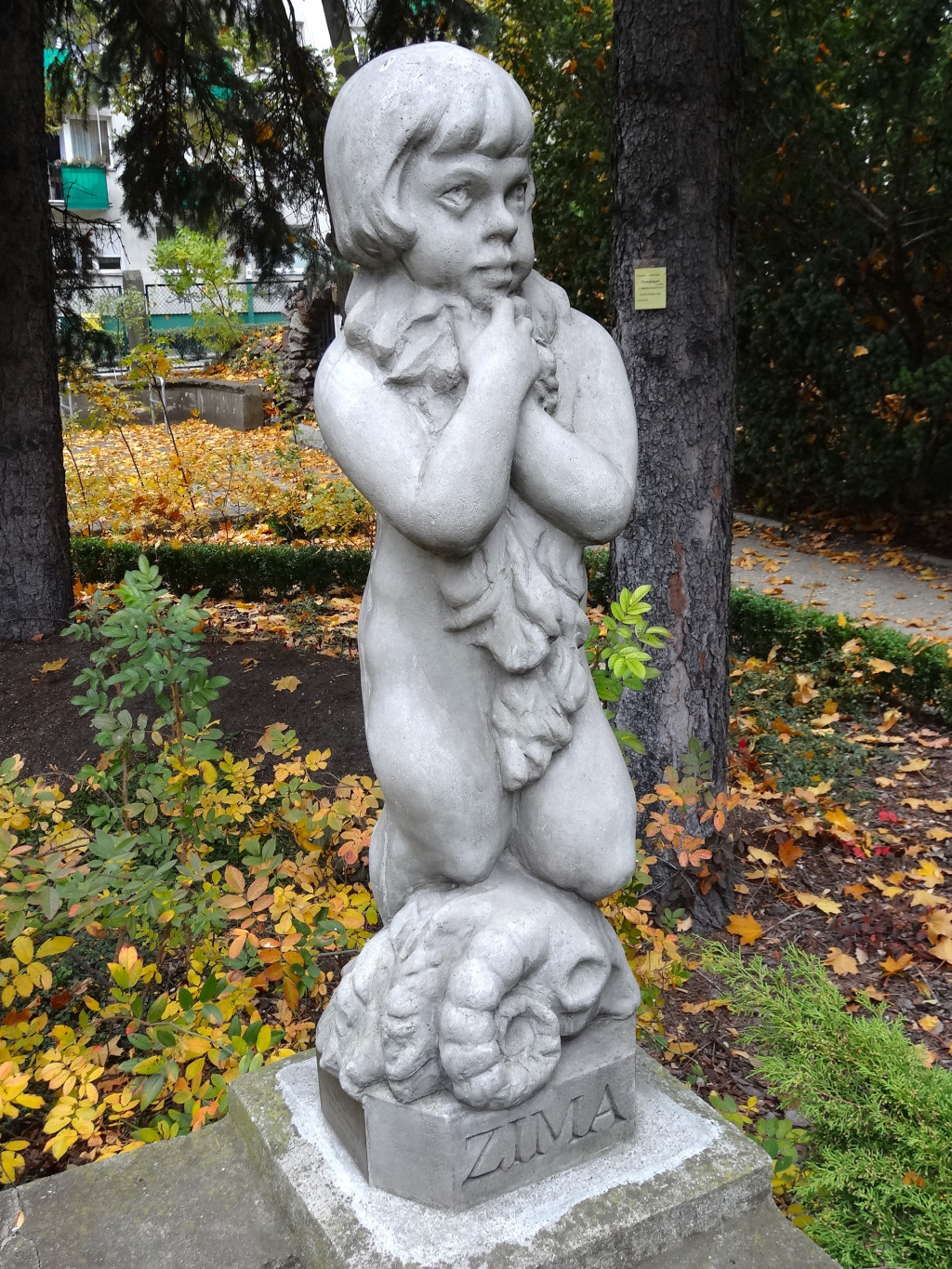
Allegory of Winter, Botanic Garden, 1930

Spring allegory, Botanic Garden, 1930

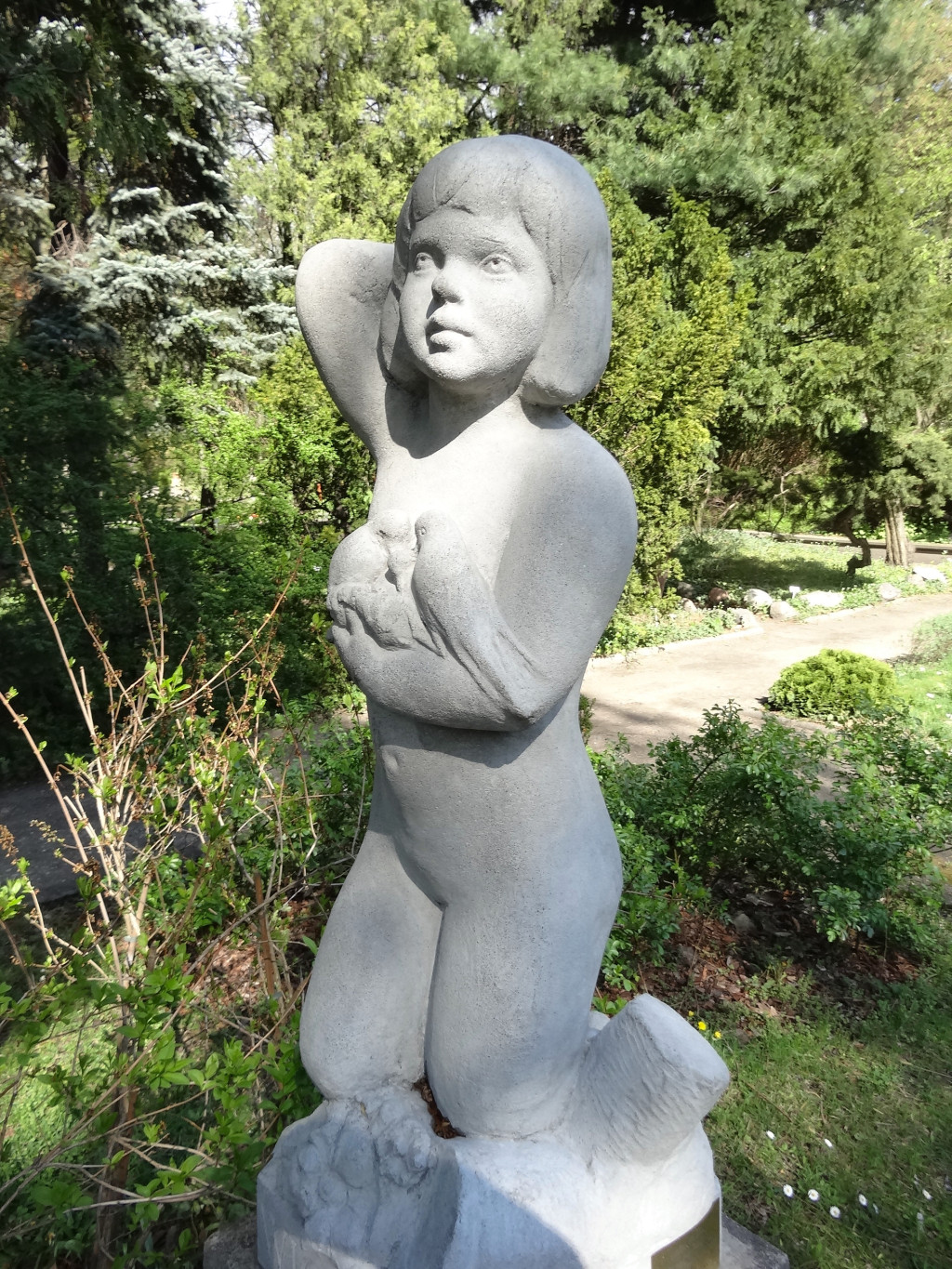
Summer allegory, Botanic Garden, 1930

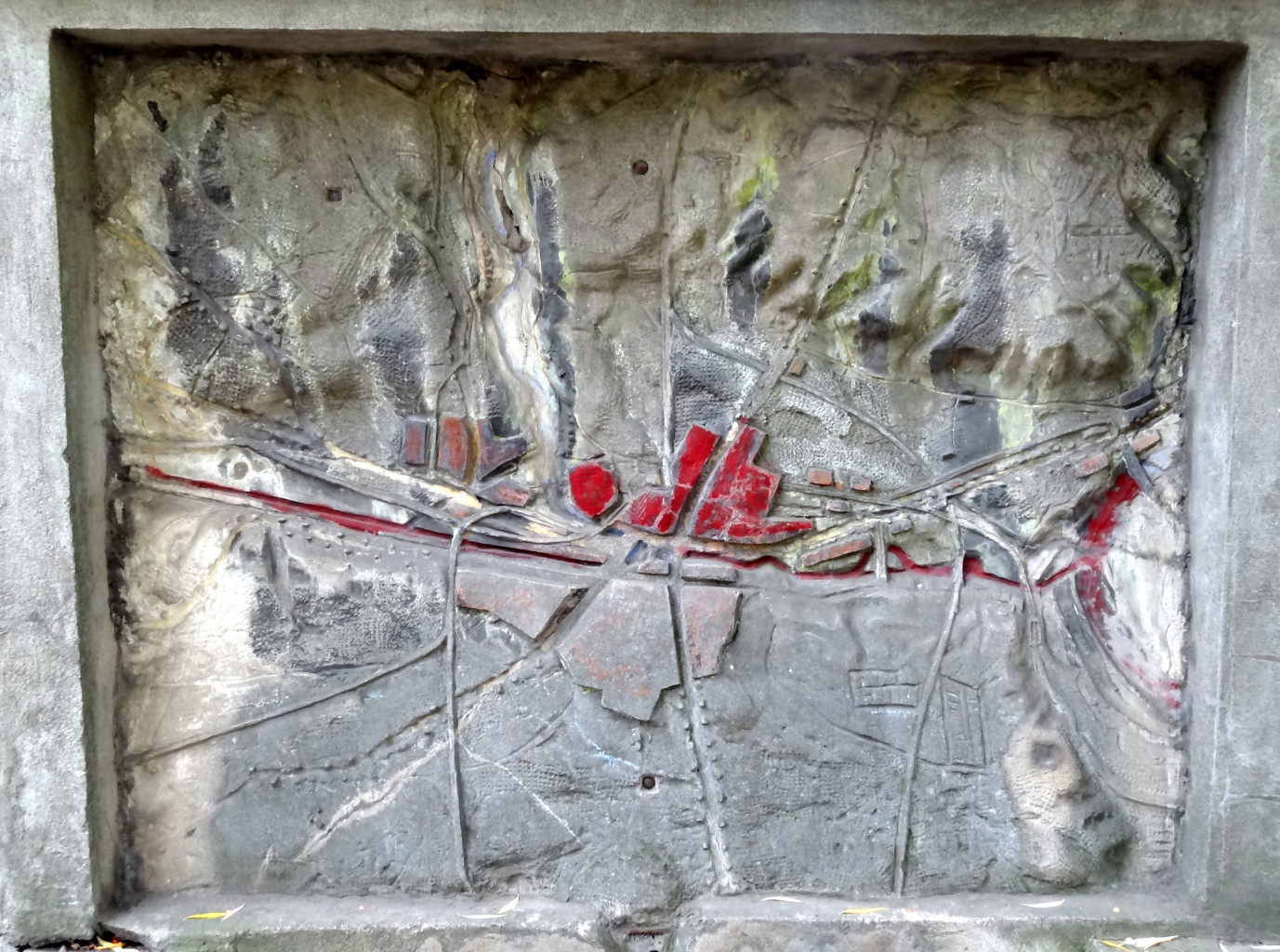
Relief map of Bydgoszcz, Botanic Garden, 1930

== See also ==
- Bydgoszcz
- List of Polish sculptors
- List of Polish people
- Jan Wysocki

== Bibliography ==
- Chojnacka, Barbara (2002). Bronisław Kłobucki – artysta rzeźbiarz. Przyczynek do dziejów bydgoskiej rzeźby w latach 1920–1939. Materiały do Dziejów Kultury i Sztuki Bydgoszczy i Regionu T7 [Bronisław Kłobucki – artist and sculptor. A contribution to Bydgoszcz history of sculpture in the years 1920–1939. Materials for the History of Culture and Art of Bydgoszcz and the Region T7] (in Polish). Bydgoszcz: Wojewódzki Ośrodek Kultury w Bydgoszczy. pp. 90–113.
- Głos Świętego Mikołaja [Voice of Saint Nicolas] (PDF) (in Polish). Bydgoszcz: Parafia Świętego Mikołaja w Bydgoszczy – Fordonie. September 2005. pp. 10–11.
