= St. John's Catholic Cemetery in Bydgoszcz =

Catholic cemetery in Bydgoszcz, Poland

St. John Cemetery in Bydgoszcz
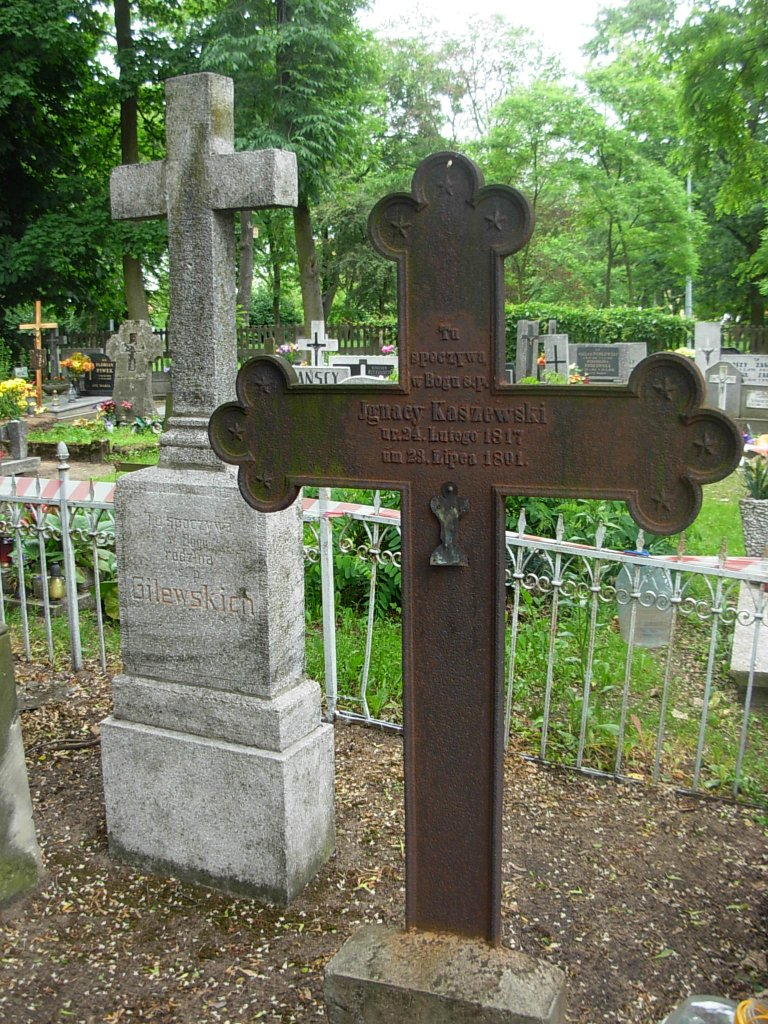
- Interactive map of St. John Cemetery in Bydgoszcz

Details
- Established: 1782
- Location: Bydgoszcz
- Country: Poland
- Coordinates: 53°9′9″N 18°10′28″E
- Type: denominational
- Owned by: Church of St. John the Apostle and Evangelist in Bydgoszcz
- Size: 0.5 ha
- No. of graves: approx. 1,000

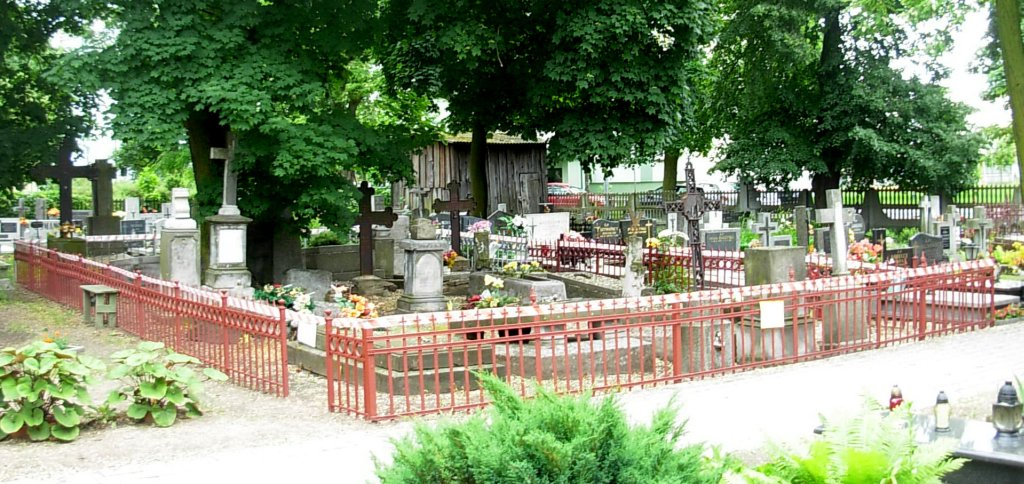
Lapidarium with the oldest tombstones

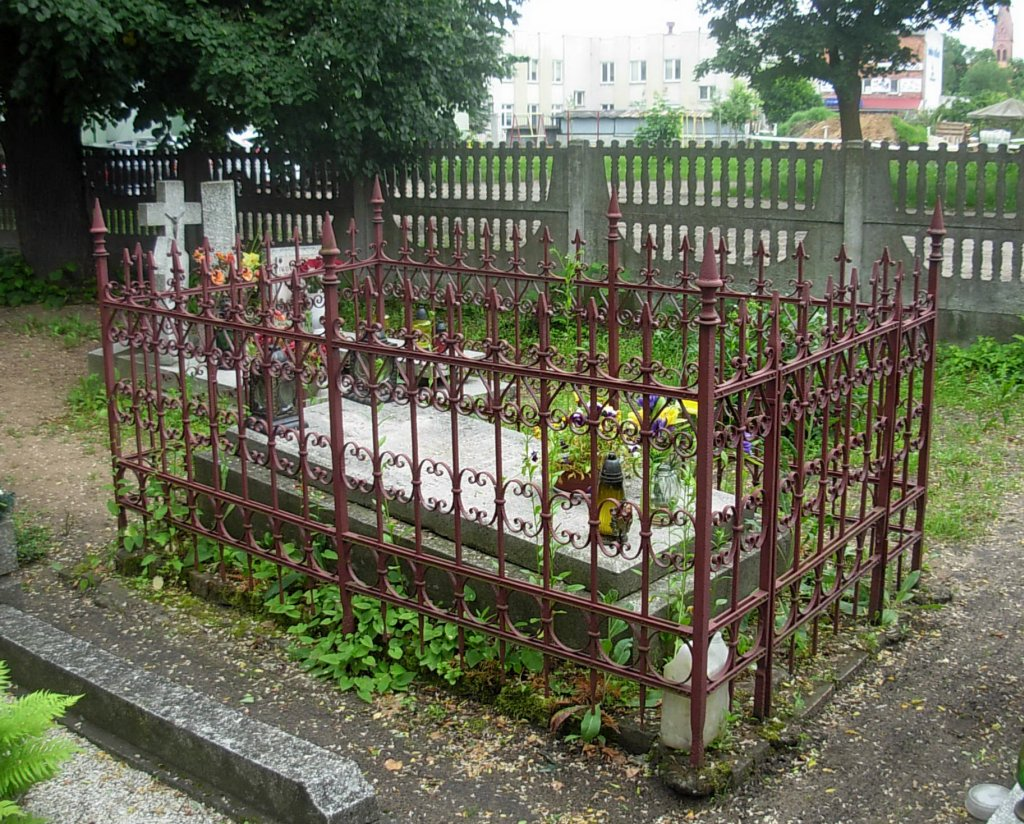
Grave of Rev. Juliusz Schmidt (1837–1929)

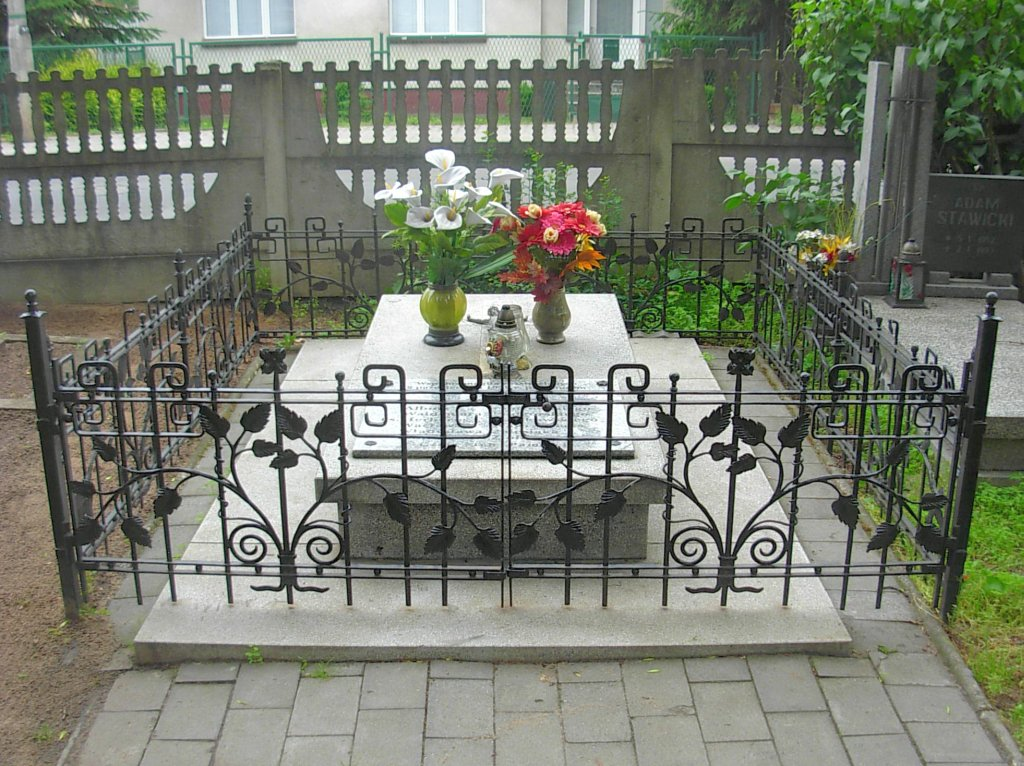
Mass grave of those executed on 2 October 1939

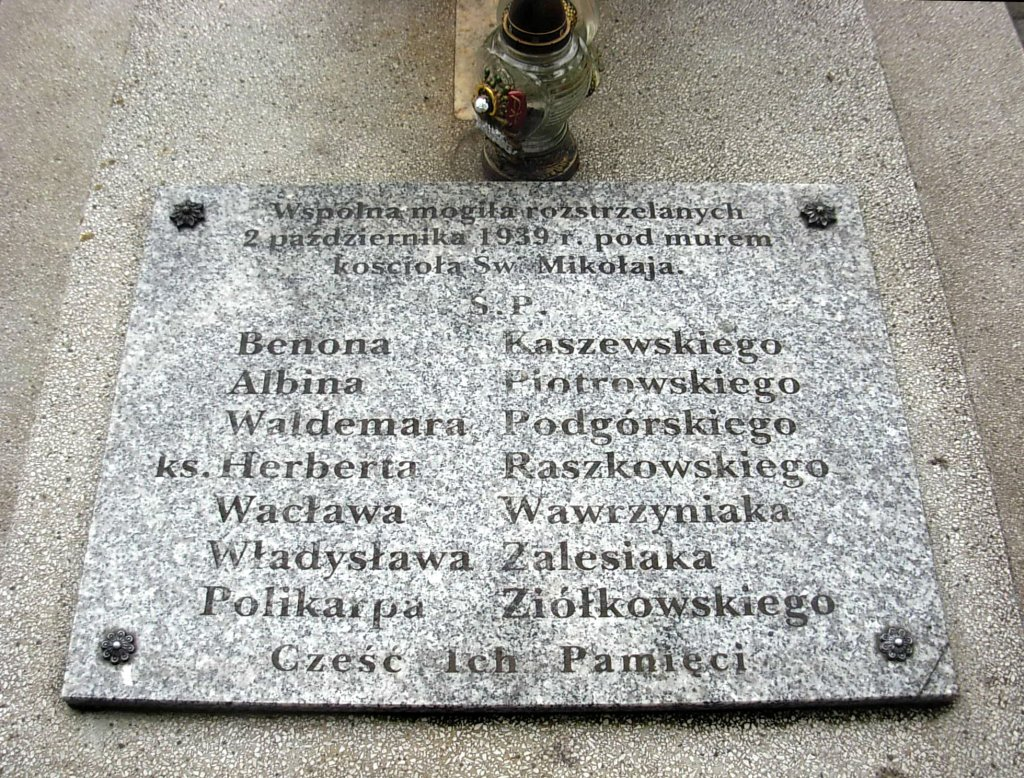
Plaque commemorating those murdered

St. John Cemetery in Bydgoszcz (Polish: Cmentarz św. Jana w Bydgoszczy) is a Catholic cemetery. Together with the Old Parish Cemetery, it is one of the oldest surviving necropolises in Bydgoszcz.

== Location ==
The cemetery is located in the Stary Fordon district, on the eastern outskirts of Bydgoszcz, near the Vistula River. The grounds border Cechowa Street to the east, between Pielęgniarska and Kryształowa streets.

== History ==
The cemetery belonged to the St. Nicholas parish until 1990, when the new St. John's parish took over. It was founded after 1780 as a result of new Prussian burial regulations. A previous churchyard cemetery existed since 1555 near St. Nicholas' Church.

The cemetery was recorded during a parish visitation in 1781 and became the main Catholic burial site for Fordon until the late 1920s.

St. John's Church was built between 1878 and 1879 for the local Evangelical community, which also had its own cemetery to the east. That cemetery was desecrated after World War II and only one gravestone survived. In 2017, a lapidarium was unveiled to commemorate it. Some remains were moved to the Evangelical-Augsburg Cemetery. A 2015 drought on the Vistula exposed old gravestones used as riverbank reinforcement.

From 1850 to 1950, a prison cemetery of the Bydgoszcz-Fordon Prison was located nearby.

In 1990, the cemetery was officially taken over by St. John's Catholic parish and underwent restoration in the 1990s. A lapidarium was formed and older stones were preserved, although some were damaged during the work.

In 1991, the cemetery was added to the heritage register.

== Description ==
The cemetery covers 0.5 hectares and had about 1,000 burials as of 1996. The oldest preserved grave is an iron cross from 1839 marking Rev. Ignacy Krieger.

Notable tombstones are kept in the lapidarium. Outside the lapidarium lie graves of prominent residents. A mass grave contains victims of the Selbstschutz executions of October 1939.

== Gallery ==
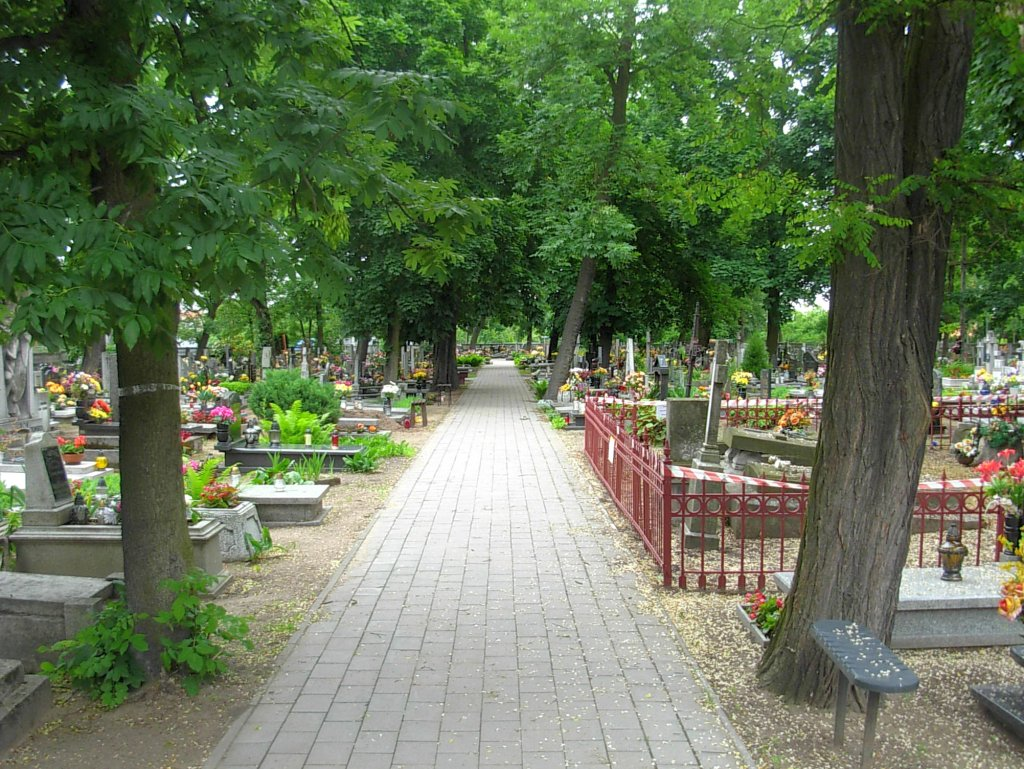
Avenue

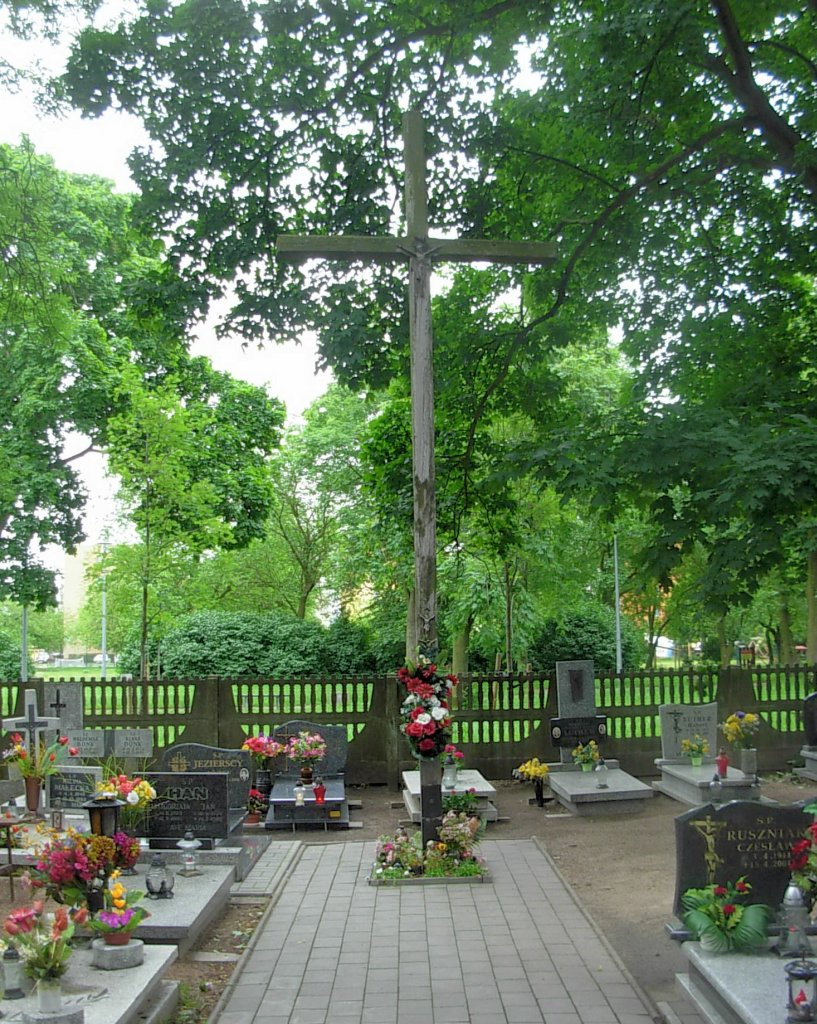
Cross

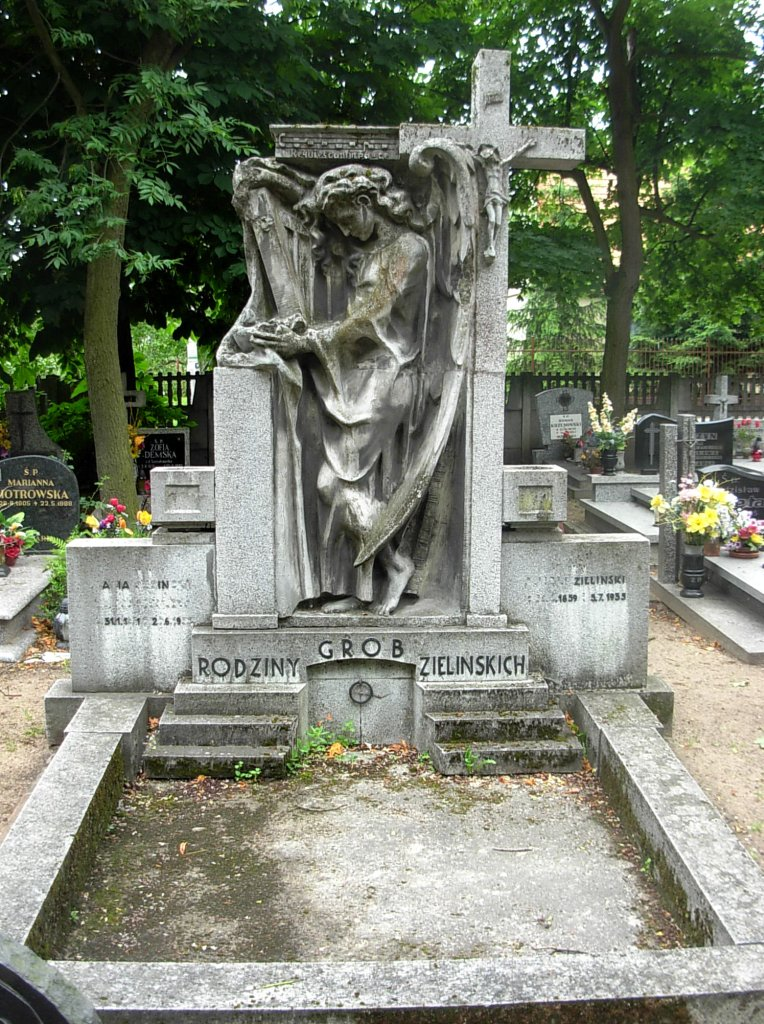
Family grave

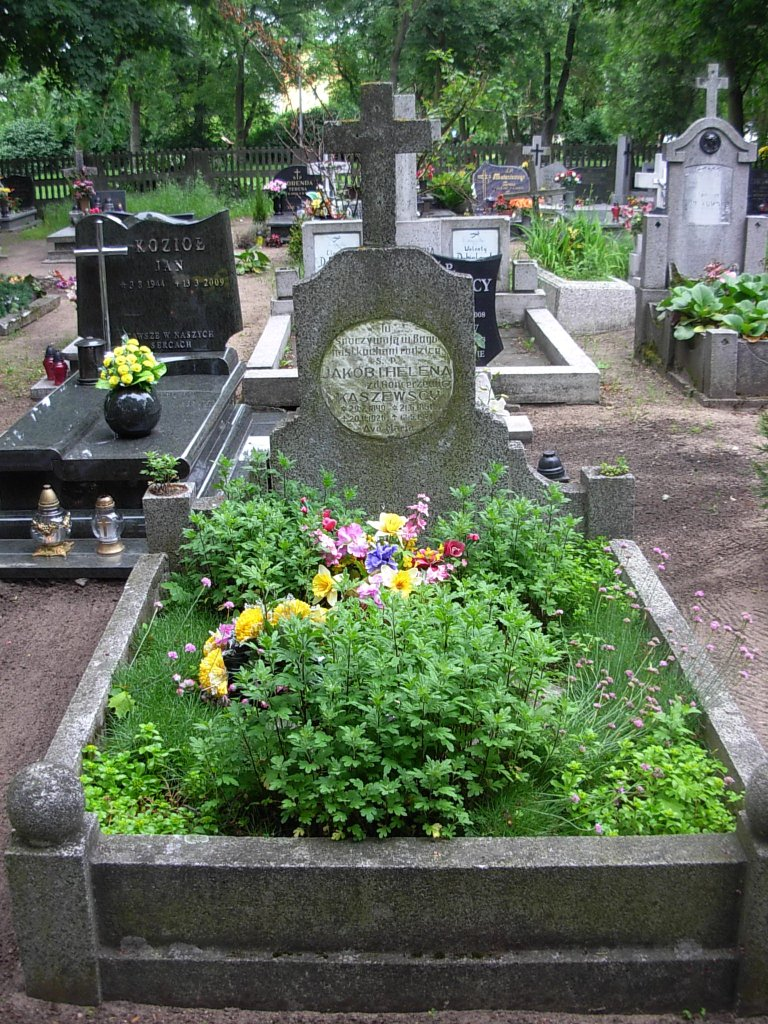
Grave from the interwar period

== Bibliography ==
- Gąsiorowski Bogdan Paweł, Zyglewski Zbigniew: Cmentarze fordońskie, in: Dzieje Fordonu i okolic. Edited by Zdzisław Biegański. Kujawsko-Pomorskie Towarzystwo Kulturalne. Bydgoszcz 1997. ISBN 83-86970-02-2
- Woźniak Zbigniew: Bydgoskie cmentarze, in: Bydgoska Gospodarka Komunalna. Bydgoszcz 1996. ISBN 83-85860-37-1
