= Church of St. John the Apostle and Evangelist, Bydgoszcz =

20th-century Catholic church in Bydgoszcz, Poland

Coordinates: 53°08′59″N 18°10′34″E

Church of St. John the Apostle and Evangelist
- Polish: Kościół św. Jana Apostoła i Ewangelisty w Bydgoszczy
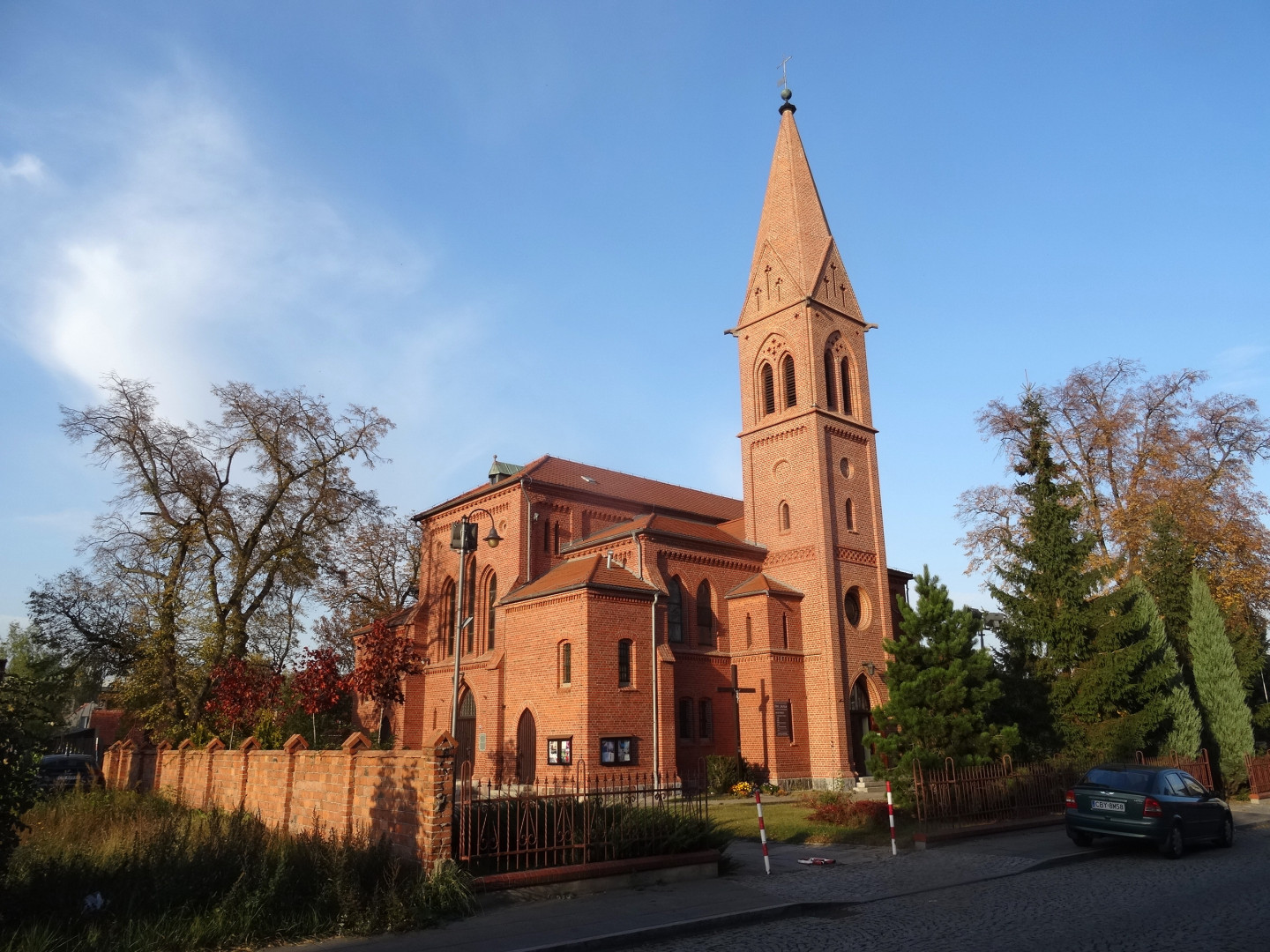
- Church of St. John the Apostle and Evangelist, Bydgoszcz
- Church of St. John the Apostle and Evangelist
- Location: 8 General gen. W. Sikorskiego, Bydgoszcz
- Country: Poland
- Denomination: Catholic Church

History
- Status: Church
- Dedication: Saint John the Apostle
- Dedicated: 27 November 1879, 1 November 1985

Architecture
- Functional status: Active
- Heritage designation: Nr. A/463/1, 1 April 1996
- Architectural type: Neo-Gothic
- Completed: 1879

Specifications
- Materials: brick

The Church of St. John the Apostle and Evangelist is a 19th-century Catholic church, dedicated to Saint John the Evangelist. The church is located at 8 General Sikorskiego street, in the district of Fordon, in the eastern part of Bydgoszcz. By decision of the Provincial Conservator of Monuments on 1 April 1996, the church has been registered on the Kuyavian-Pomeranian Voivodeship Heritage list. It was built between 1878 and 1879 in the Gothic Revival style using red clinker brick.

== History ==
After the First Partition of Poland in 1772, German Protestant settlers established themselves in Fordon. An independent Evangelical community was founded in 1822 with about 2,000 members from 36 nearby villages.

Construction began on 16 October 1878 and was completed in November 1879. The church was consecrated on 27 November 1879 by Consistorial Superintendent Taube of Bromberg.

In 1945, as the German Protestant population departed, the church was taken over by municipal authorities and used as a grain warehouse and later a clothing storehouse. In the 1970s, the building faced demolition due to deterioration, but efforts by Fr. Stanisław Grunt of St Nicholas Church preserved it. In 1983, it was officially transferred to the Catholic Church, fully renovated, and re-consecrated by Bishop Marian Przykucki on 1 November 1985. In 1990, the Catholic parish of St John was formally erected.

=== Evangelical communities ===
The construction of the church took place in the context of the development of Evangelical communities in then Bromberg and its vicinity in the 19th century.

Evangelicals arrived in the village of Fordon after 1772. They were German settlers encouraged by the incentive policies of the Kingdom of Prussia. Initially attached to the commune of Bromberg, the project of establishing an independent parish in Fordon received the support of Frederick William III of Prussia (1770–1840). However, the fulfilment of this scheme was hindered in 1806 by the signing of the Treaties of Tilsit and the creation of the short-lived Polish Duchy of Warsaw by Napoleon.

It was not until 1822 that Fordon was established as the seat of the Evangelical churches in the area. The ensemble comprised nearly 2 thousand Evangelical people from 36 nearby villages.

In 1855, 30 of them, located on the right side of the Vistula, formed their own religious community based in Ostromecko. The local church was subordinated to the Superintendent in Poznań.

In 1824, a pastor's house was built, housing as well the Evangelical school; this building harbored a prayer room during the construction of the temple. The Evangelical school building still stands today, at 4 Wyzwolenia Street: its walls shelter nowadays the Primary school No.4 and Kindergarten No.57 (Zespół Szkolno - Przedszkolny nr 4).

In 1888, an Evangelical cemetery was opened on present day's Cechowa Street, adjacent to the Catholic cemetery. After WWII, pieces of funerary monuments from the abandoned Evangelical cemetery were used to strengthen the Vistula escarpment and create ridges. These elements were exposed by the low level of the river in 2015: in order to preserve the excavated fragments, local associations asked for the creation of a park on the plot of ancient cemetery. To this end, a Lapidarium park was unveiled in 2017. The oldest funeral elements date back to 1870 and the place is marked with a commemorative plaque stating (in Polish):

"Lapidary of the Protestant cemetery, which was located here until 1945. It was created from relics recovered from the Vistula River and secured by the Old Fordon Friends Association in the summer of 2015. In memory of the residents of the town of Fordon buried here. On the 500th anniversary of the Reformation".[16]

=== Evangelical temple ===
The construction of the temple began on 16 October 1878 and was completed in November 1879. On 27 November 1879, the church was solemnly consecrated to John the Apostle (Johannis – Kirche) by Consistorial Superintendent Taube from Bromberg. Nevertheless, furnishing and interior decoration were finished only in 1892. The architecture style followed neo-Gothic features, quite popular in the region at the time for religious buildings. Bricks are the main construction element. For the construction, the religious community obtained a loan of 21,000 Marks, which was later partially covered by the state treasury.

The tower and the sacristy visible today were added in the first decade of the 20th century. The church was named after John the Apostle. It was equipped with two bells made of bronze and a pipe organ made by Wilhelm Sauer from Frankfurt (Oder), acquired for 4,000 Marks. The bells were melted down during World War I.

Local Evangelical parishes thrived between 1850 and 1914. At the eve of WWI, Evangelical Germans constituted the majority of the population of Fordon and the surrounding area, reaching approximately 3,000 people. After the conflict, the community shrank to 900 people and counted only 300 souls before the start of World War II.

In the interwar period, the Evangelical-Union Church played an important role in the life of the German minority in Fordon. The parish encompassed the following towns and villages: Strzelce Dolne, Strzelce Górne, Jarużyn, Miedzyń, Mariampol, Zofin, Łoskoń, Pałcz, Czarnówko, Siernieczek and Brdyujście. In 1929, on the 50th anniversary of the church's erection, the edifice was renovated, thanks to the support of the Gustav-Adolf-Werk in Wrocław. The works included, among others:

- a new large altar carpet made of pure wool;
- the painting of the chancel in blue color;
- two steel bells from the Schelling foundry in Apolda, replacing the original ones lost during WWI.

In 1933, the Evangelical Church in Fordon was granted the same privileges and rights as the neighbouring Catholic Church.

=== Catholic church ===
The temple operated for Evangelical people until 1945, when the last members of the German parish left Poland.

The church was then taken over by the Bydgoszcz starosta and given to Catholic authorities, like 16 other Evangelical churches in Bydgoszcz and its vicinity. However, the clergy took several years to enforce this decision, leading to a 30 years delay for effectively taking over the church.

Before long, the communist authorities decided to convert the building, first into a grain warehouse in the late 1940s, and then into a protective clothing warehouse in the 1950s.

In the 1970s, the dilapidated building was marked for demolition by the city authorities. It had a damaged roof, cracked walls, a damaged tower pillar, gaps in the foundations and walls, missing doors, no more interior fixtures, missing balcony railings and devastated window frames.

At the same time, the parish priest of close by Saint Nicholas Church, Father Stanisław Grunt, struggled to regain the ancient edifice back for religious purposes. His efforts succeeded in 1983, when the church was officially transferred to Saint Nicholas parish.

A major overhaul took place between 1983 and 1985; a nursery was even set up in the ex-pastor's house. On 1 November 1985, the building was dedicated once again, by Bishop Marian Przykucki; it was especially designated for the "Emmaus" Academic Pastoral Care Center.

In 1990, the independent parish of Saint John the Apostle and Evangelist was established: it was solemnly dedicated by Archbishop Henryk Muszyński then archbishop of Gniezno and primate of Poland, on 27 December 2000. It was the first of a series of new churches in Fordon dedicated to the Four Evangelists.

== Architecture ==
=== Exteriors ===
The church is a three-nave basilica with an east-facing chancel, a polygonal apse, and a tall southern tower topped by a hexagonal spire. Its exterior is buttressed and features pointed-arch windows and rose windows. The tower and sacristy were added in the early 20th century.

The original fittings included two bronze bells and a pipe organ built by Wilhelm Sauer of Frankfurt (Oder). A 21,000-mark loan was obtained to fund construction, partially repaid by the Prussian state. The church displays a Neo-gothic style, popular in Bromberg in sacred architecture at the turn of the 20th century.

The edifice has three naves, with a layout similar to a basilica and the chancel facing east. The latter is enclosed by a three-sided apse and a sacristy, while the exterior walls are buttressed. Some of the openings present rosette forms, others are topped with pointed arches. A tall church tower with a flèche overlooks the parvis. On the ground floor is the porch which originally served as the main entrance.

=== Interiors ===
The interior retains its Protestant heritage with wooden galleries empora. The side aisles have flat ceilings, while the main nave features a sloping roofline. In the 1990s, Catholic liturgical furnishings, including pews, confessionals, and a tabernacle, were added. In 2001, exterior illumination was installed. Three bells cast by the Kruszyński foundry (450 kg, 250 kg, 170 kg), named Mary, John the Apostle, and Thomas, were installed in 1995.

The church's interior is quite austere, mirroring its Neo-Gothic style. The inside exhibits massive galleries, characteristic of Evangelical churche design. The side naves are covered with flat ceilings, while the main nave reveals a ceiling broken in the middle. The church's contemporary furnishings and decor were designed in the 1990s by artists Halina and Włodzimierz Krzemkowski from Bydgoszcz. Several paintings can be noticed. They are the works of Władysław Burchardt:

- Our Lady of Perpetual Help;
- Saint John the Evangelist, the church's patron saint, resting on the chest of Jesus during the Last Supper;
- the Stations of the Cross.

Between February 1993 and June 1995, the church received sacred furnishings and sacramental artefacts: pews, confessionals, a tabernacle, chalices, ciboriums and church linen. It was only then officially adapted to the celebration of the Catholic liturgy.

In 1995, three bells have been installed up in the church tower, crafted by the Kruszyński brothers from Węgrów:

- Mary, weighing 450 kg;
- John the Apostle, weighing 250 kg;
- Thomas the Apostle, weighing 170 kg.

They were consecrated on 24 June 1995 by Bishop Bogdan Józef Wojtuś.

In 2001, the church was equipped with external lighting and other equipment were added or renovated in 2010:

- new fencing (September);
- renovated entrance doors (October);
- stained-glass transom light above the entrance doors (November);
- underfloor heating installed (November).

This same year, the parish introducied a special Holy Mass for people with disabilities, with sign language interpretation.

Eventually, the steeple was renovated in 2017.

== Gallery ==
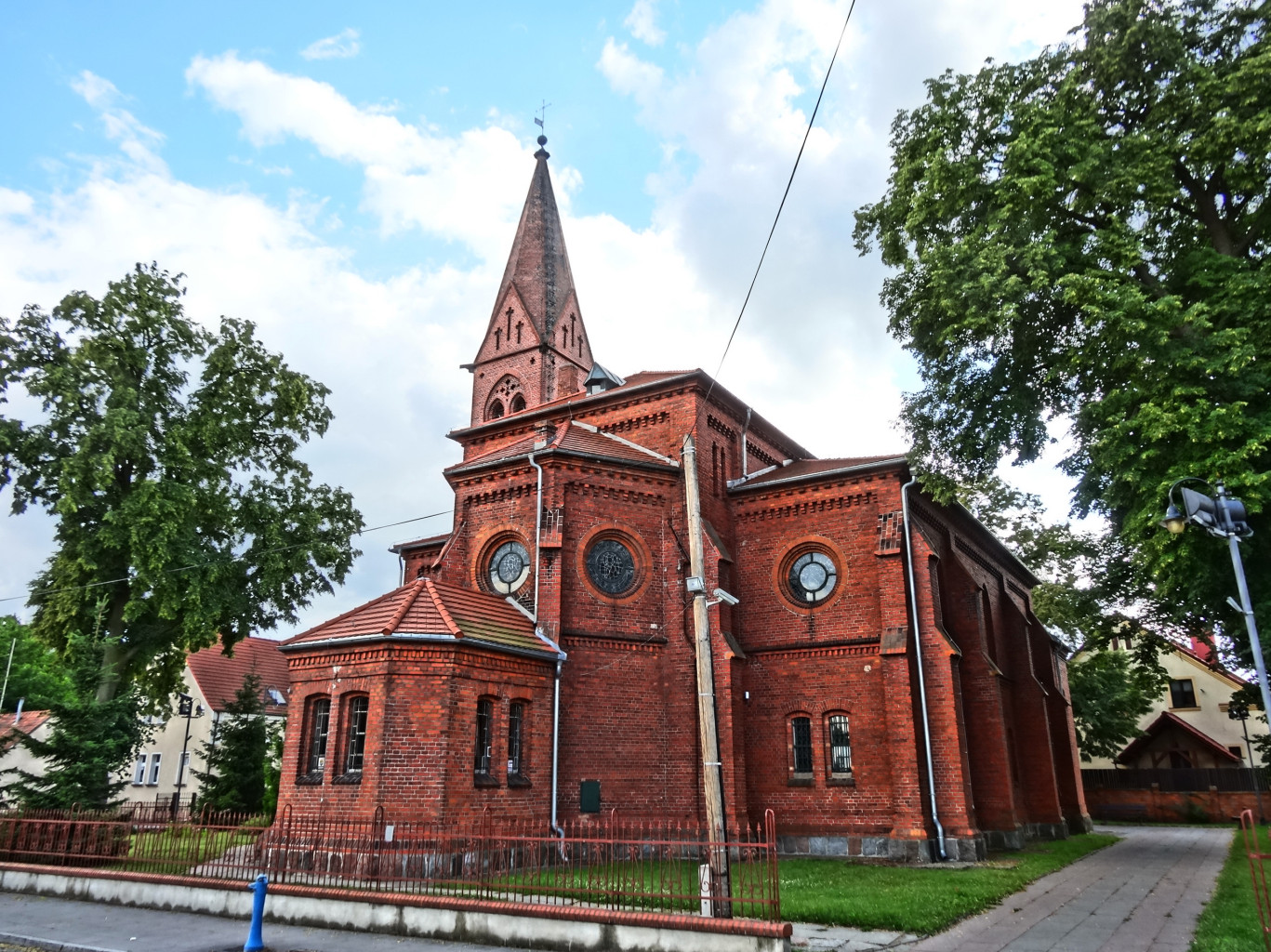
Outside view of the chancel

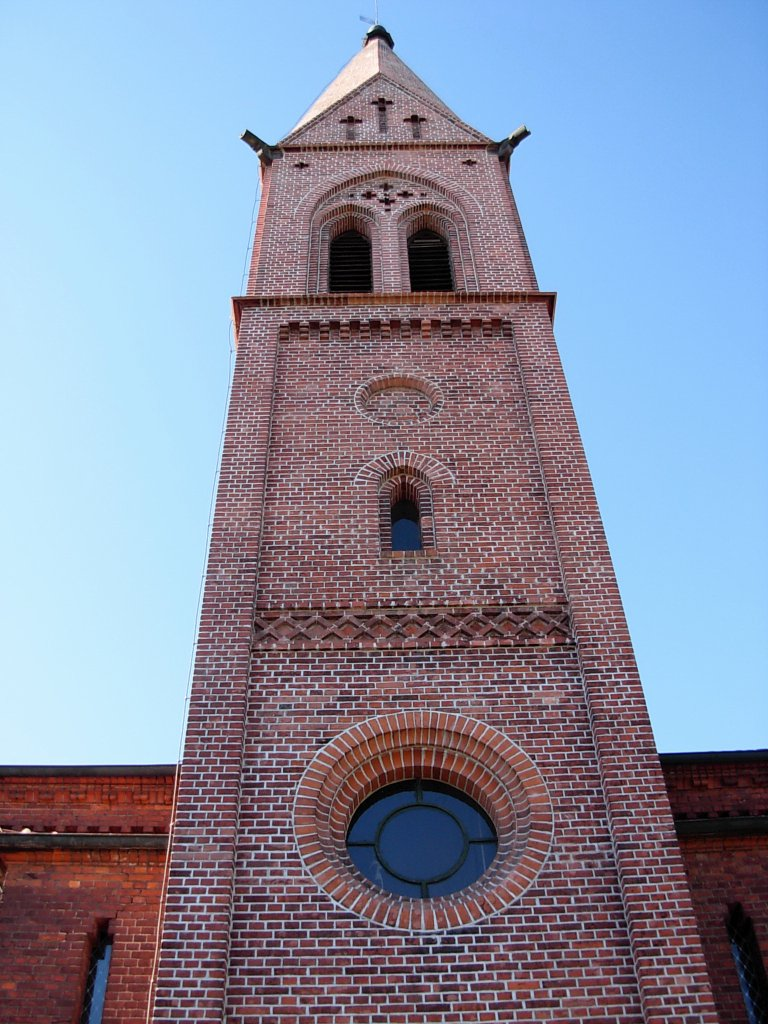
View of the steeple

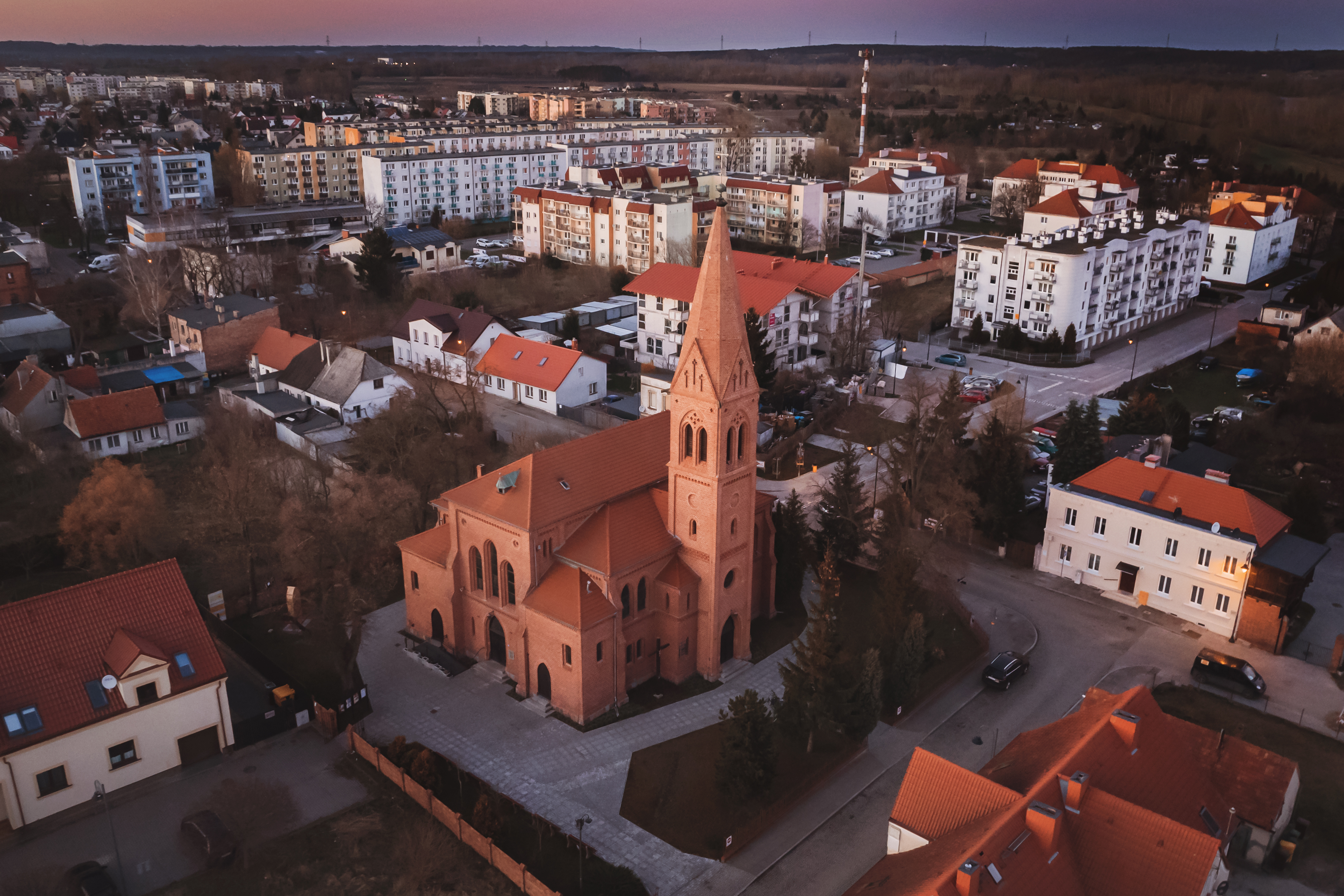
Bird eye view

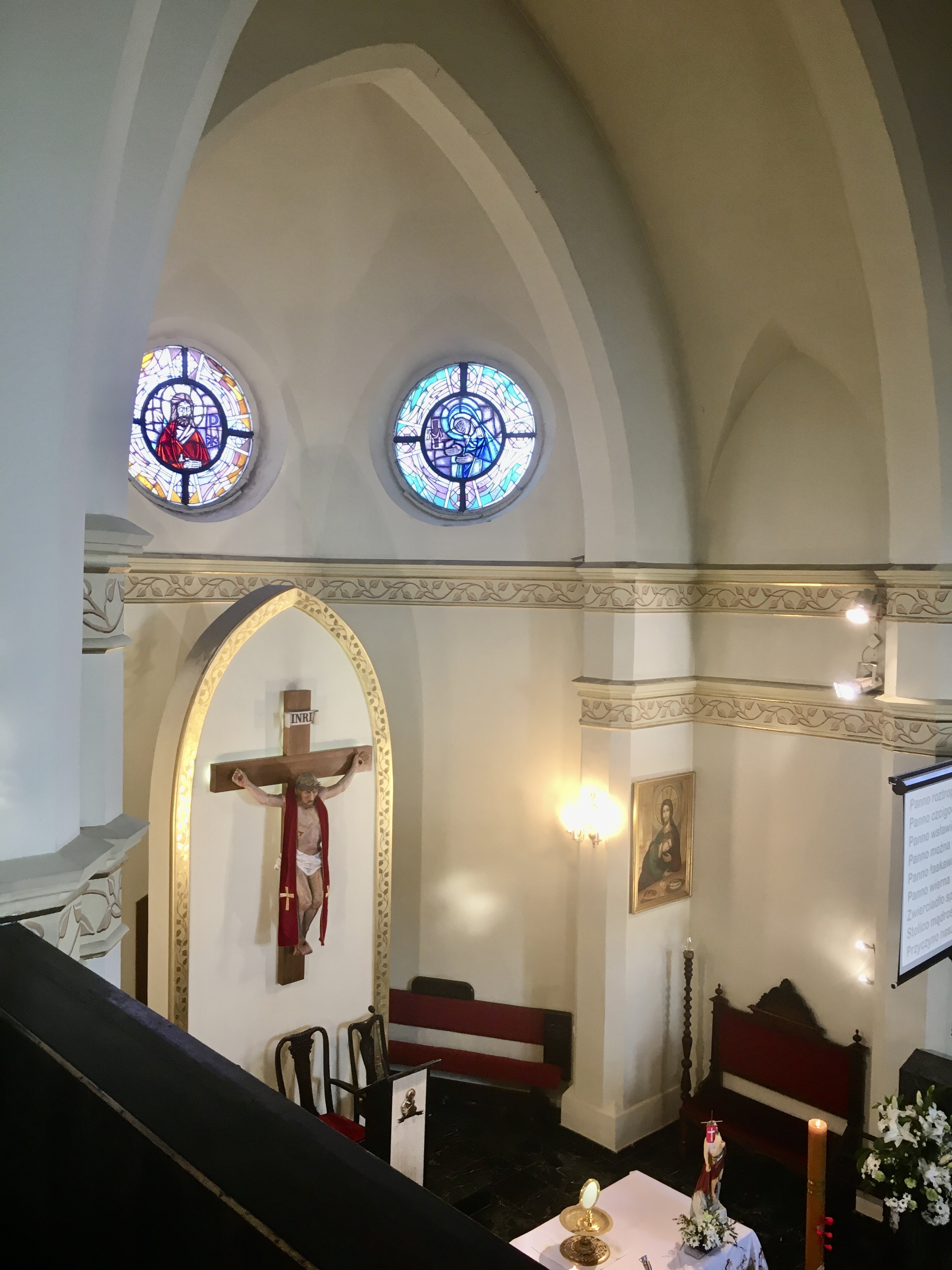
Interior

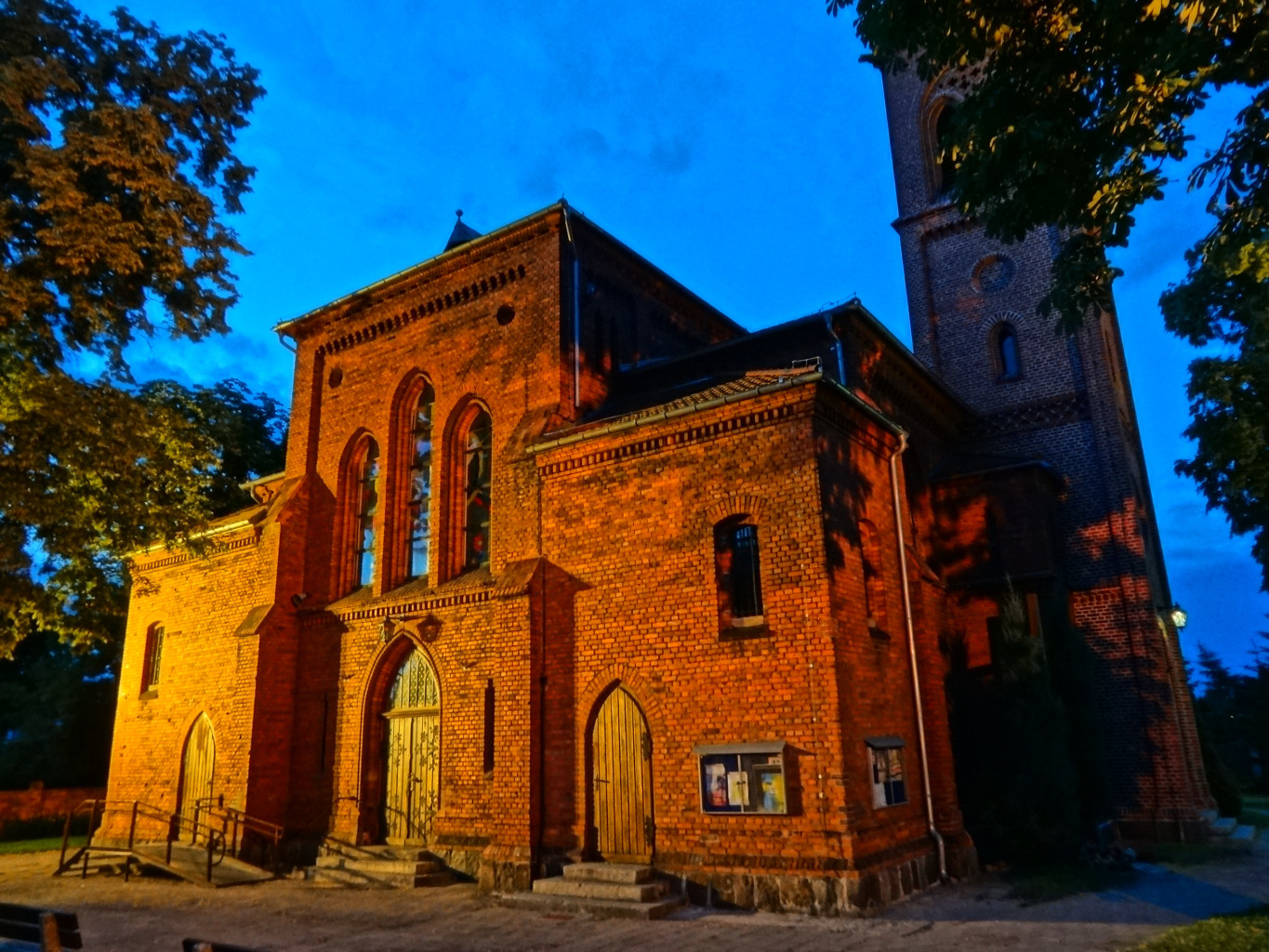
By night

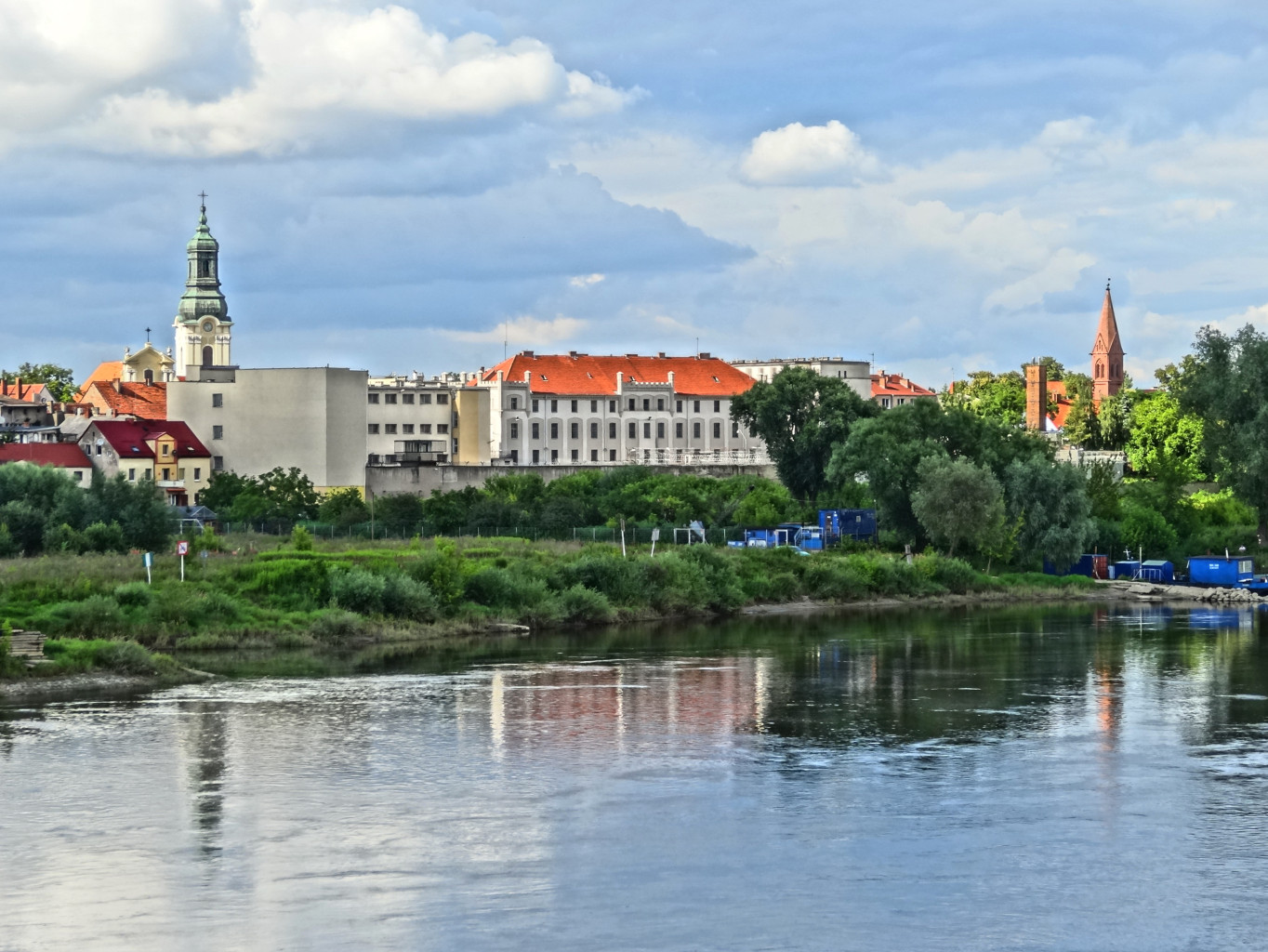
View from the Vistula river: Saint Nicholas (left), St. John the Apostle and Evangelist (right)

== See also ==
- Bydgoszcz
- Fordon, Bydgoszcz
- Saint Nicholas Church, Fordon

== Bibliography ==
- Parucka, Krystyna (2008). Zabytki Bydgoszczy – minikatalog [Monuments of Bydgoszcz – mini-catalogue.] (in Polish). Bydgoszcz: Tifen. ISBN 9788392719106.
- Derenda, Jerzy (2006). Piękna stara Bydgoszcz – tom I z serii Bydgoszcz miasto na Kujawach. Praca zbiorowa [Beautiful Old Bydgoszcz – Volume I of the series Bydgoszcz, a city in Kujawy. Collective work.] (in Polish). Bydgoszcz: Towarzystwo Miłośników Miasta Bydgoszczy.
- Biegański, Zdzisław (1997). Dzieje Fordonu i okolic [The history of Fordon and the surrounding area] (PDF) (in Polish). Bydgoszcz: Kujawsko-Pomorskie Towarzystwo Kulturalne.
- Biskup, Marian (1991). Historia Bydgoszczy. Tom I do roku 1920 [Bydgoszcz History. Volume 1 till 1920] (in Polish). Warszawa-Poznań: Bydgoskie Towarzystwo Naukowe.
- Father Książek, Przemysław (1991). Historia kościoła pw. św. Jana Apostoła i Ewangelisty w Fordonie. Kalendarz Bydgoski [The history of the church of St. John the Apostle and Evangelist in Fordon. Bydgoszcz Calendar] (in Polish). Bydgoszcz: Towarzystwo Miłośników Miasta Bydgoszczy. pp. 215–218.
- Father Rybka, Paweł (2020). Kościół św. Jana w Fordonie [St. John's Church in Fordon] (in Polish). Bydgoszcz-Fordon.
