= Saint Nicholas Church, Bydgoszcz =

20th-century Catholic church in Bydgoszcz, Poland

Coordinates: 53°08′59″N 18°10′25″E

Saint Nicholas Church
- Polish: Kościół św. Mikołaja w Bydgoszczy
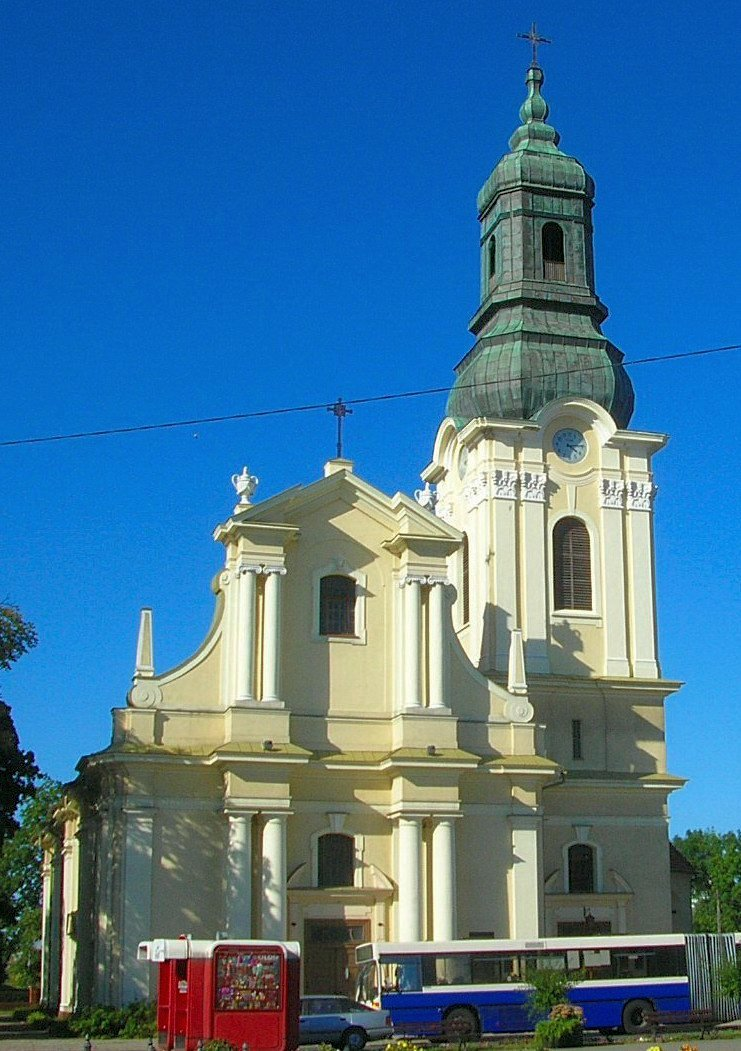
- Saint Nicholas Church, Bydgoszcz
- Saint Nicholas Church
- Location: 2 Wyzwolenia street, Fordon, Bydgoszcz
- Country: Poland
- Denomination: Catholic Church
- Website: https://www.milosierdzie.bydgoszcz.pl/

History
- Status: Church
- Dedication: Saint Nicholas
- Dedicated: 1933

Architecture
- Functional status: Active
- Heritage designation: Nr. A/424/1, 20 October 1994
- Architect: Stefan Cybichowski
- Architectural type: Neo-Baroque
- Completed: 1929

Specifications
- Materials: Brick

Saint Nicholas Church is a church located in Bydgoszcz district of Fordon. It has been several times reconstructed in its existence: the current edifice, designed by Stefan Cybichowski, dates back to the late 1920s.

The church is located on the northern side of the market square of the Old Fordon, in the eastern end of Bydgoszcz territory, approximately 400 metres (1,300 ft) from the Vistula river. The edifice has been registered on the Kuyavian-Pomeranian Voivodeship Heritage list on 20 October 1994.

== History ==
St. Nicholas' Church is the oldest religious building in the district of Fordon, despite having undergone many rehabilitations.

=== First wooden edifice ===
The inhabitants of the then town of Fordon used to go for services to the Church of St. Mary Magdalene positioned on the hillfort (Wyszogród) on the bank of the Vistula river (2 kilometres (1.2 mi) west of St. Nicholas' Church). At that time, St. Mary Magdalene was the oldest parish church in the area (established in the 12th century).

The stronghold of Wyszogród was razed in 1330 in the wake of the Polish–Teutonic War, which forced the relocation of the settlement to the east, where present-day Fordon seats.

The first wooden church was built in 1424, when the town of Fordon was established for the second time by Władysław II Jagiełło. In the 1530s, the center of parish life moved definitively from forsaken Wyszogród to Fordon: this decision condemned St. Mary Magdalene church to a gradual abandonment in the 15th century.

In 1435, a first priest had been established in Fordon: the parish then included the town itself and the neighbouring villages of Łoskoń, Pałcz, Wyszogród, Siersko (all incorporated in today's territory of Bydgoszcz), Jarużyn and Strzelce Dolne. As a matter of fact, the current parish of St. Nicholas is a continuation of the medieval Wyszogród parish.

The exact date of the erection of the first church in Fordon is unknown, but the patron saint was already Saint Nicholas. Inside this wooden church were three altars, the main one featured a statue of the Transfiguration of Jesus. The parish priest was usually assisted by two vicars. The first church operated until the end of the 16th century.

=== First brick church ===
In 1598, Baltazar Miaskowski, the Suffragan bishop of Włocławek also acting as the parish priest of Fordon, ordered the construction of a brick church dedicated to Saint Nicholas; it was completed in the first half of the 17th century. The Gothic style building displayed a single nave without a steeple. By and large, this church survived under this form with minor changes until the beginning of 1927. It was erected outside Fordon dense downtown, on a square where people used to wait the ferry across the Vistula river.

The parish district of Fordon - 1781

In 1632, members of Łukasz Wybranowski's family, from the Poraj nobility, were buried in the crypt beneath the chancel. In 1691, a new building was erected after a fire, differing from the previous one by the addition of a northern chapel dedicated to Saint Anne. During the first half of the 18th century, the church was thoroughly renovated, with the inclusion, among other things, of a brick porch and a tower topped by a ridge turret.

After the completion of these works, the edifice had five altars:

- the main one dedicated to the Resurrection of the Lord;
- a side altar in Saint Anne's chapel;
- side altars devoted the Annunciation, Saint Barbara and Saint Joseph.

In front of the church, a column with the figure of Saint John Nepomucene was erected. Furthermore, a parish school and a shelter for the poor were also set up at that time. From 1765, the parish church was the seat of the Fordon deanery (Włocławek diocese). In 1824, the parish was subordinated to the diocese of Chełmno which seated in Pelplin. In Fordon, in the pre-partition era, there were three religious brotherhoods, devoted to Saint Anne, Saint Barbara and Saint Joseph.

During the Prussian Partition years (1772–1918), due to the difficult financial situation of the Polish community in Fordon, the parish church was quite neglected. Few investments were realized, late in the 19th century:

- a small chapel added to the northern wall of the church;
- a porch to an additional entrance was carved out in the southern side.

=== Current church ===
After Poland regained independence in 1920, Fordon saw many population changes, leading to a Catholic faith uniformity among the inhabitants. On the one hand, dwindling Evangelical and Jewish communities still possessed large religious buildings (Protestant church of Saint John the Apostle and Fordon synagogue), on the other hand, local Catholics were dissatisfied with the inadequate 17th-century religious building, too small for their needs. As a consequence, decision was made in 1923 to expand the church, while Father Bolesław Piechowski (1885 in Osówka-1942 in Dachau) was parish administrator. The design of the temple was prepared the same year by Stefan Cybichowski: the architect from Poznań had already realized many sacred buildings in Bydgoszcz, in Greater Poland and in Pomerania. He planned to keep only the walls of the original church and enlarge it in a Neo-baroque single-nave, three-bay edifice with a tower topped by a tented roof.

Works started began in 1926, with the demolition of the nave and chapel of the old church. The construction of the new designed elements was carried out between 1927 and 1928. Thanks to the renovation, the church was extended northward by an additional bay, hence increasing the nave's length by 8 metres (26 ft) and enlarging the openings to bring more light inside the temple. The church tower was erected in 1929: the three suspended bells came from the demolished wooden tower. The final works continued through the early 1930s with the delivering of the church furniture and the laying of a layer of plaster merging the ancient and the new parts of the edifice.

The expansion of the church radically transformed the building's shape into a majestic, neo-Baroque structure dominating the old Fordon.

In September 1939, the church was damaged by bombing and was subsequently closed by the German occupation authorities until January 1940. On 2 October 1939, a public execution took place on the market square, in front of the wall of the parish church: among the eight victims were Wacław Wawrzyniak, the Mayor of Fordon, Fathers Henryk Antoni Szuman and Herbert Raszkowski.

After the war, despite the difficulties, renovations and minor investments resumed:

- a new altar to Saint Barbara unveiled;
- new stained glass windows and church floor in marble (1959);
- modern lighting and a public address system installed;
- renovation of the pipe organ.

In 1959, Professor Konrad Dargiewicz from Toruń painted a fresco on the vaulted ceiling.

On 12 June 1980, the church tower burned down after a lightning strike. Subsequent repairs and renovations were carried out in 1982: the steeple's neo-baroque dome was then replaced by a copper sheeting.

A thorough refurbishment of the edifice was performed in the 1990s:

- renovation of the facade (1994);
- restoration of the tower and installation of a clock (1995);
- set up of an external lighting system (1998).

In 2004, the Fordon parish moved under the responsibility of the Bydgoszcz diocese.

== Architecture ==
=== Exteriors ===
The current church exhibits a neo-Baroque architectural style. The brick plastered building has a single nave, with a closed chancel facing north and a steeple in the southeast corner Although the first edifice was facing east, it is currently laid on a north–south axis.

At the eastern elevation stands a chapel closed on three sides: it a vestige of the original chancel. A rectangular sacristy is located on the northern side. The facade displays two levels:

- on the ground floor, tuscan order columns fence the main entrance;
- the upper one shows a pair of ionic order columns, together with volutes and finials.

The 48.8 metres (160 ft)-high tower is decorated with pilasters crowned with corinthian order capitals and prominent cornices. The steeple is topped by a massive copper dome, built in the 1980s.

=== Interiors ===
The interior roof exhibits a barrel vault supported by wall columns, with lunettes located on the arches. The chapel features a wooden coffered ceiling. The crypt still holds Wybranowski's family tombs from 1639, near the chapel's northern wall.

The pipe organ is the work of by the organ builder Wilhelm Sauer: it was originally standing in the Evangelical Church in Fordon (now the Catholic Church of St. John the Apostle and Evangelist), from where it was moved to its current location after 1945, by Bydgoszcz organ builder Józef Sobiechowski.

The furnishing is a mix of elements from the 1920s-1930s and remnants of Baroque items from the old church. Of particular note are:

- the altars with their paintings;
- the frescoed ceiling;
- stained glasses and statues.

==== Altars ====
The following altars stand in the church:

1. the main altar in the chancel, designed by Stefan Cybichowski. Till 1937, it was accompanied by the painting Descent from the Cross by Antoni Michalak, replaced in 1947 by the painting The Blessed Virgin Mary by Stanisław Wojciechowski;
2. a side altar in the chancel with a sculpture of The Sacred Heart of Jesus, by Bronisław Kłobucki from Bydgoszcz;
3. a side altar in the chancel with a sculpture of Saint Joseph by Bronisław Kłobucki;
4. a Baroque altar in the academic chapel, which is the former main altar of the 17th-century church;
5. a polychrome side altar of Saint Barbara, located opposite the academic chapel. Renovation works on Saint Barbara's picture revealed a second image from the 19th century, Madonna and Child with Saint Anne, funded by A. Kryska;
6. a contemporary prayer altar (ca. 1960), with the painting Divine Mercy image, standing at the front of the nave on the right side of the presbytery;
7. a contemporary prayer altar (ca. 1960), with the image of Our Lady of Perpetual Help, at the front of the nave on the left side of the presbytery.

==== Remains of the original church ====
The oldest part of the church (16th century) is preserved in the chapel adjoining the eastern side: this ancient chancel was originally separated from the nave by an arched roof, which 2 rounded-arch windows have survived. These openings are currently filled with stained glass realized by the art studio of Stanisław Powalisz from Poznań:

- the left stained glass window depicts Saint Adalbert, whose patronage is associated with Wyszogród hillfort;
- the right stained glass window portrays Saint Mary Magdalene, the saint patron of the church of Wyszogród. Since 1977, this space has been serving as the Academic Chapel.

The chapel houses the former Baroque main altar of the 17th-century church. The altar's finial was made in the mid-18th century in the Rococo style. The altarpiece features a painting from the mid-17th century, depicting the Adoration of the Blessed Virgin Mary by Saint Nicholas and Saint Martin.

On the northeastern side, one can notice the architecture of the original low sacristy with its original barrel vault; the ensemble is joined to the modern nave by an arch adorned by lunettes.

Three small 2-faced paintings on metal from the ancient church still survive till this day:

- Madonna and Child with Saint Anne (on one side) and a Franciscan monk (on the other side), in a Gothic style frame:
- Immaculate Conception (on one side) and Saint Anthony (on the other side), from the late 18th century, with polychrome;
- 19th-century images of Holy Trinity with Saint Anne and Mary of Nazareth (on one side) and Saint Nicholas (on the other side), on an 18th metal frame.

Among the parament artefacts, one can cite:

- a golden Gothic chalice from 1585, with a Renaissance ornamentation, realized by the workshop of Jakub Grunau in Toruń;
- a Baroque chalice from 1734, from a Gdańsk workshop;
- a forged Baroque monstrance in silver from 1745;
- a late-Renaissance and Baroque chalice.

The church had a bell from 1643, with the inscription Laudate Dominum in cymbylis bene sonantibus (Praise the Lord with sounding cymbals) and a medallion of Saint Nicholas, cast in the workshop of the bell founder Gerhard Benningk in Gdańsk. This bell fall to the ground on 12 June 1980, during the tower fire, and got cracked.

In the early 1990s, the damage bell was melted down to cast a new one for the Church of St. John the Apostle and Evangelist, established in 1990 in Fordon.

== Gallery ==
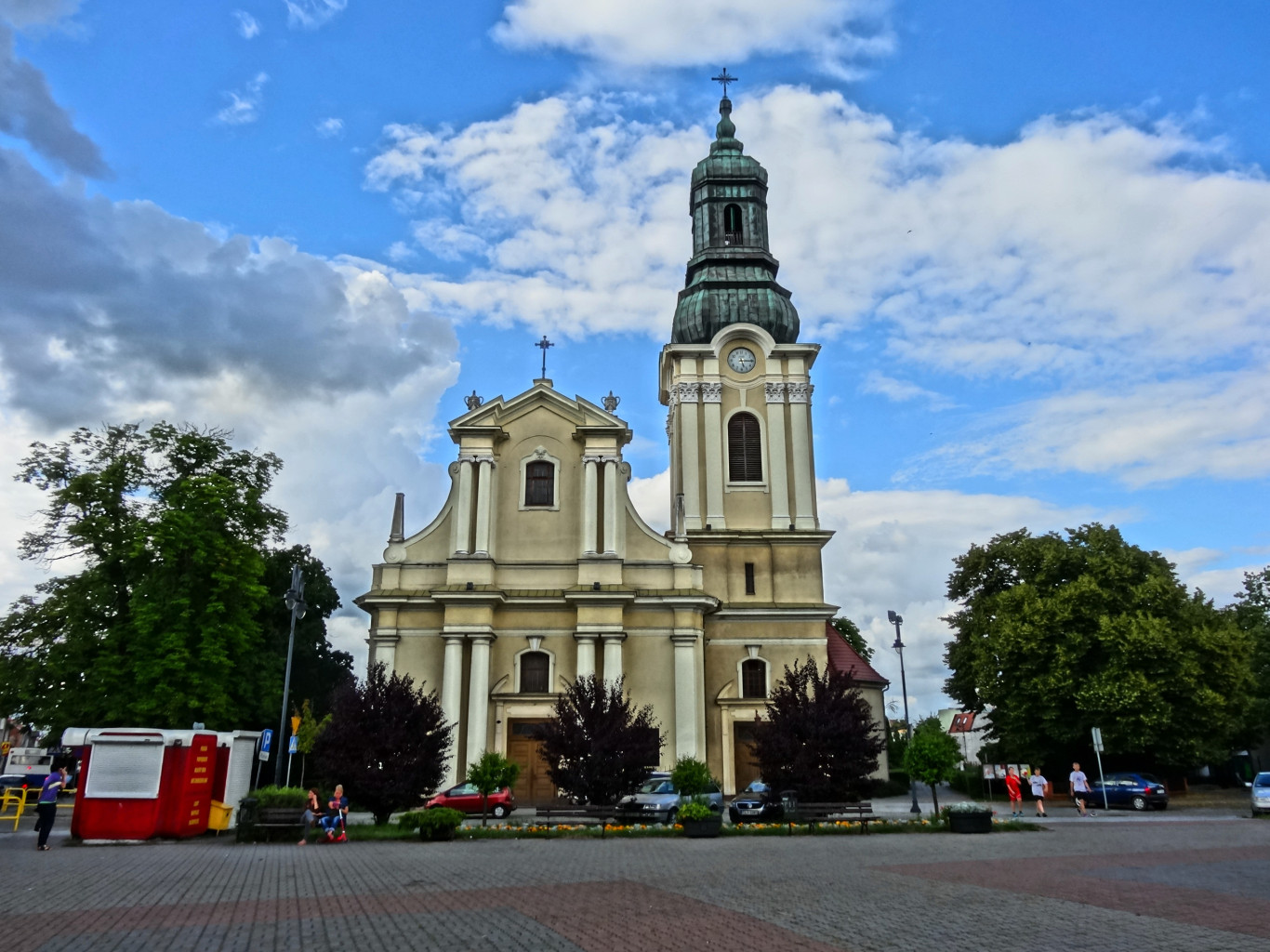
The church and the parvise

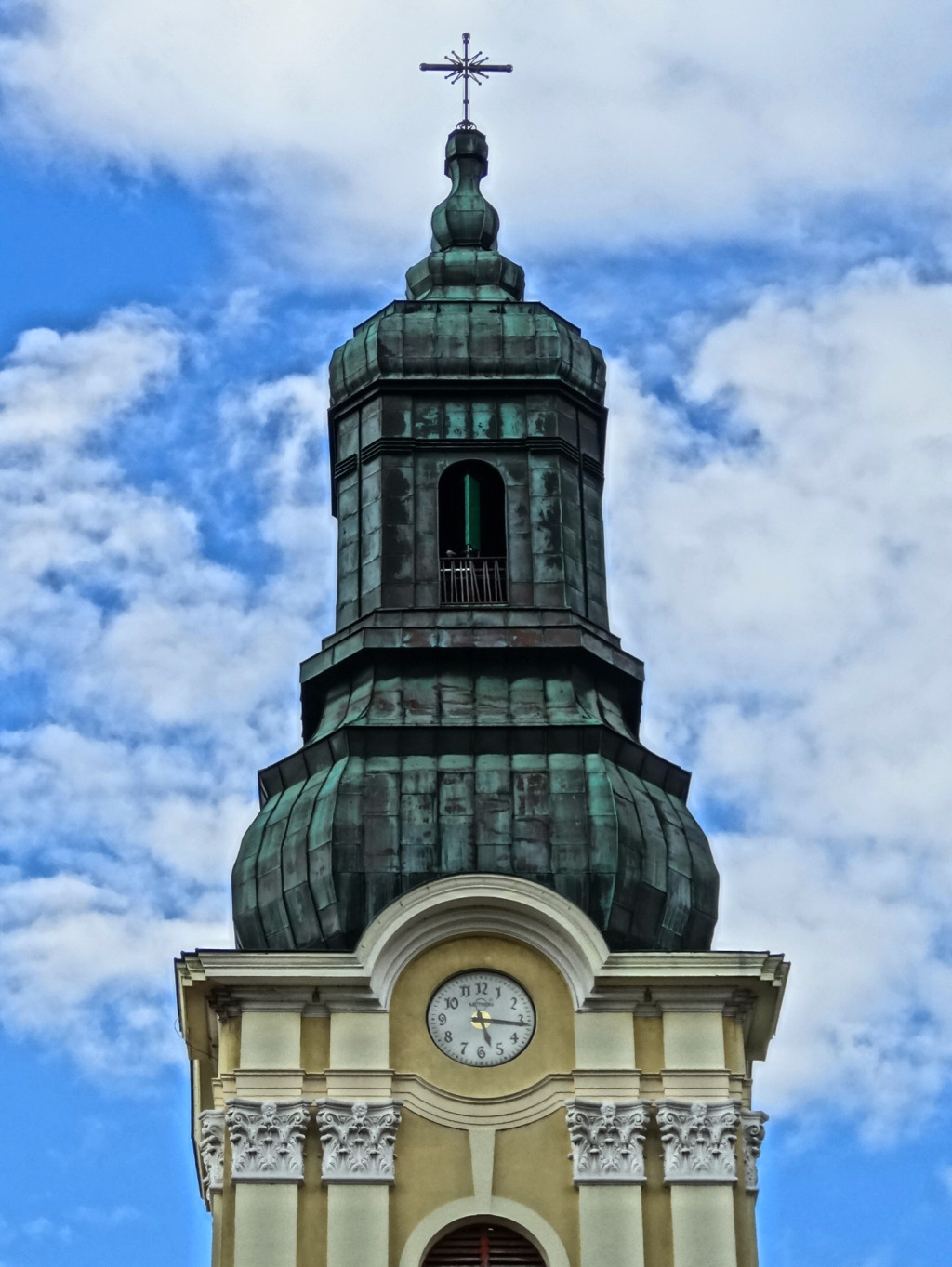
Detailed view of the copper roof of the tower

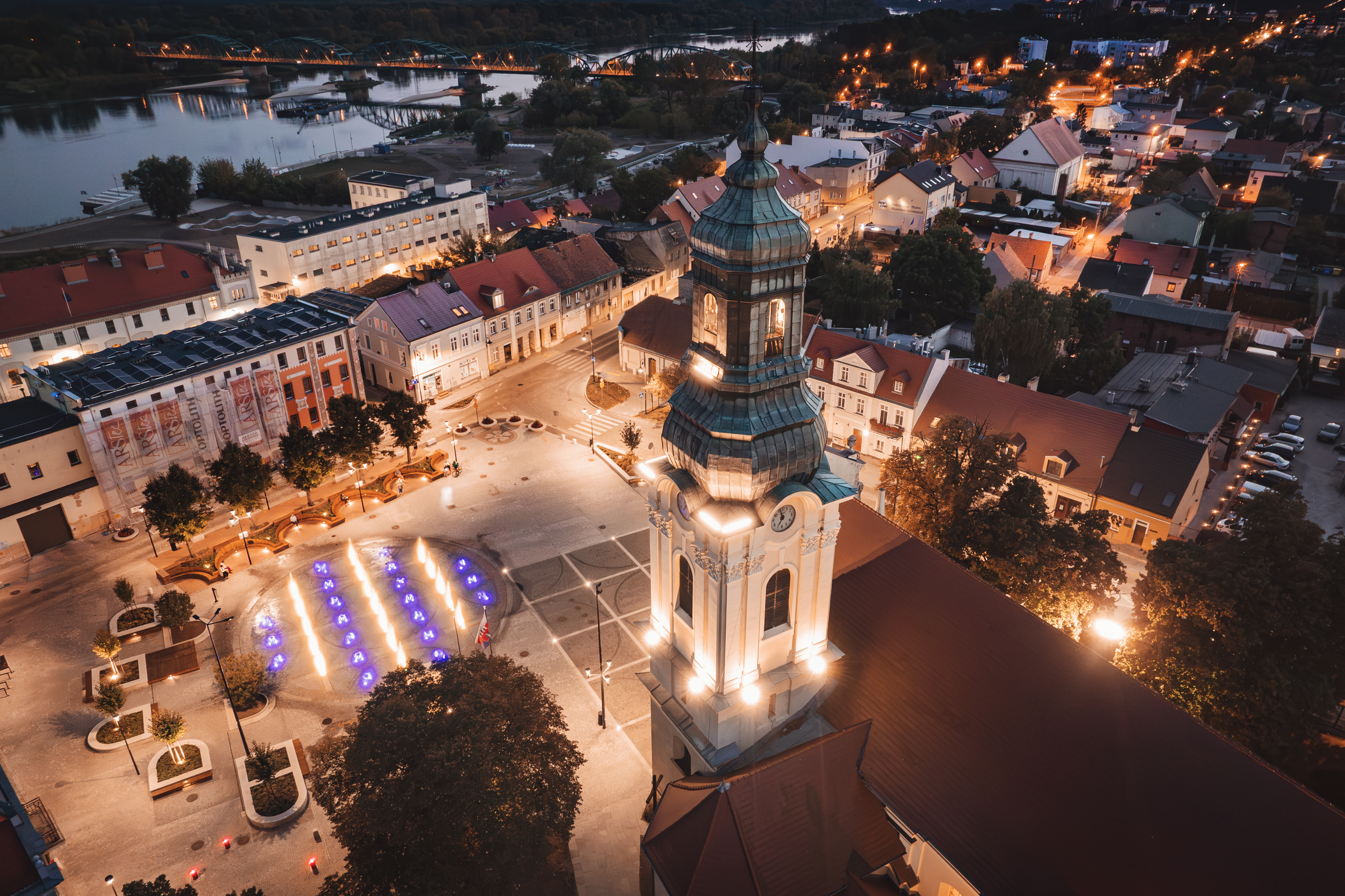
By night

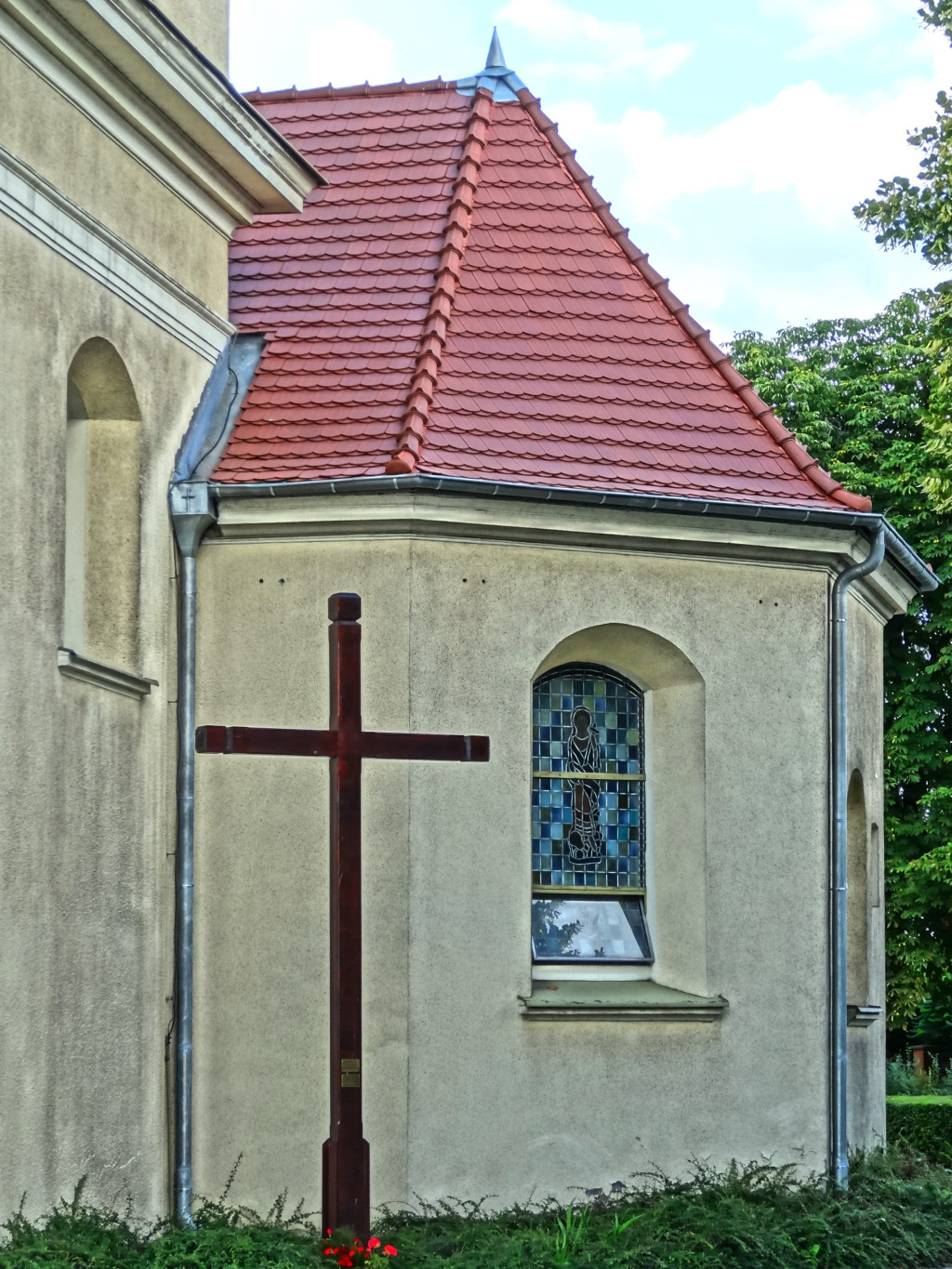
Academic chapel - remants of the first church

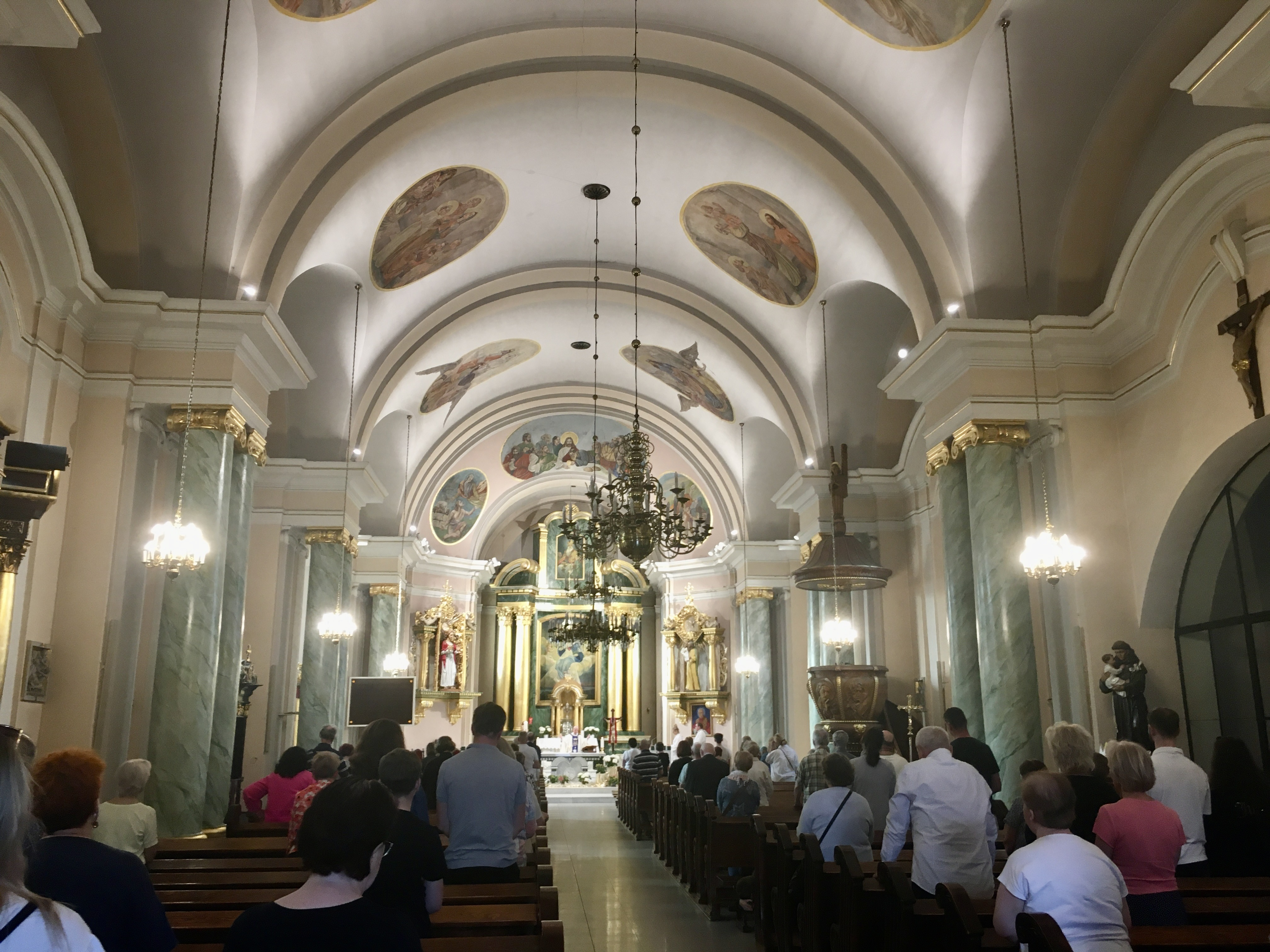
Interior view of the nave

== See also ==
- Bydgoszcz
- Bydgoszcz Architects (1850–1970s)
- Fordon, Bydgoszcz
- Bronisław Kłobucki
- Władysław II Jagiełło
- Polish–Teutonic War (1326–1332)

== Bibliography ==
- Derenda, Jerzy (2006). Piękna stara Bydgoszcz – tom I z serii Bydgoszcz miasto na Kujawach. Praca zbiorowa [Beautiful Old Bydgoszcz – Volume I of the series Bydgoszcz, a city in Kujawy. Collective work.] (in Polish). Bydgoszcz: Towarzystwo Miłośników Miasta Bydgoszczy.
- Biegański, Zdzisław (1997). Dzieje Fordonu i okolic [History of Fordon and the surrounding area.] (in Polish). Bydgoszcz: Kujawsko-Pomorskie Towarzystwo Kulturalne.
- Biskup, Marian (1991). Historia Bydgoszczy. Tom I do roku 1920 [Bydgoszcz History. Volume 1, till 1920.] (in Polish). Warszawa-Poznań: Bydgoskie Towarzystwo Naukowe.
- Bartowski, Krzysztof (1996). Zabytki Fordonu – kościół parafialny pw. św. Mikołaja [Monuments of Fordon – parish church of St. Nicholas.] (in Polish). Bydgoszcz: Materiały do dziejów kultury i sztuki Bydgoszczy i regionu.
- Wilk, Henryk (1991). Historia parafii, kościoła św. Mikołaja i Fordonu [History of the parish, St. Nicholas Church and Fordon.] (in Polish). Bydgoszcz: Parafia św. Mikołaja w Fordonie.
