= Church of St. James the Greater, Sokolniki =

St. James Church
- Church of St. James the Greater Apostle in Sokolniki
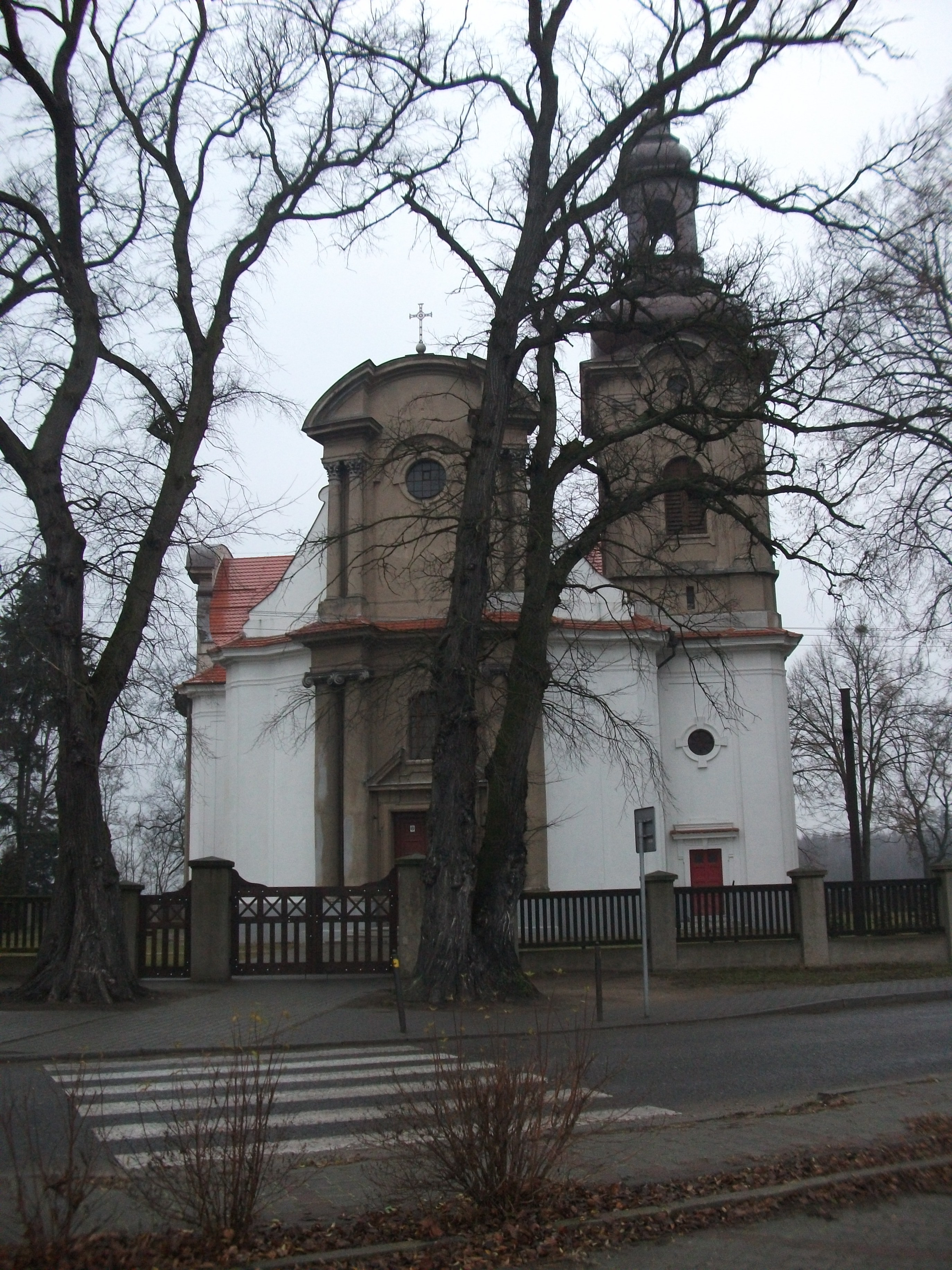
- St James Church
- St. James Church
- 52°15′12.3″N 17°42′32.17″E
- Location: Sokolniki
- Country: Poland
- Denomination: Catholic Church

History
- Status: Parish Church
- Dedication: James, son of Zebedee
- Consecrated: 28 August 1932

Architecture
- Functional status: Active
- Designated: 26 April 1974
- Style: Baroque Revival
- Completed: 1926

Specifications
- Materials: Brick

Administration
- Archdeaconry: Roman Catholic Archdiocese of Gniezno
- Parish: St James the Greater Apostle in Sokolniki

The Church of St. James the Greater Apostle is a parish in Sokolniki, Września County, Poland, built in the thirteenth century. Its consecration took place in 1416. The current church, constructed in neo-baroque style, was built 1926 and consecrated by August Hlond on 28 August 1932 and it was designated on 26 April 1974. It is one of 10 parishes within the deanery. On 6 September 2009, the Board of Greater Poland approved the list of operations for the Rural Development Programme for the years 2007 to 2013. The district thus received a grant to repair the church roof.

== Documents ==
Parish registers:

- Baptisms since 1795
- Marriages since 1795
- Deaths since 1795
