= Sokolniki, Września County =

Sokolniki
- Village
- Location within Poland
- Coordinates: 52°15′N 17°42′E
- Country: Poland
- Voivodeship: Greater Poland
- County: Września
- Gmina: Kołaczkowo
- Highest elevation: 100 m (330 ft)
- Lowest elevation: 90 m (300 ft)
- Population: 660

Sokolniki [sɔkɔlˈɲikʲi] is a village in the administrative district of Gmina Kołaczkowo, within Września County, Greater Poland Voivodeship, in west-central Poland. The Church of St. James the Greater stands in the village.
