= Brzoza, Bydgoszcz County =

Brzoza
- Village
- Location within Poland
- Coordinates: 53°1′52″N 18°0′32″E
- Country: Poland
- Voivodeship: Kuyavian-Pomeranian
- County: Bydgoszcz
- Gmina: Nowa Wieś Wielka
- Population: 3,149

Brzoza [ˈbʐɔza] is a village in the administrative district of Gmina Nowa Wieś Wielka, within Bydgoszcz County, Kuyavian-Pomeranian Voivodeship, in north-central Poland.
