= St. Nicholas Church, Wszembórz =

Coordinates: 52°11′10″N 17°37′38″E

St. Nicholas Church in Wszembórz
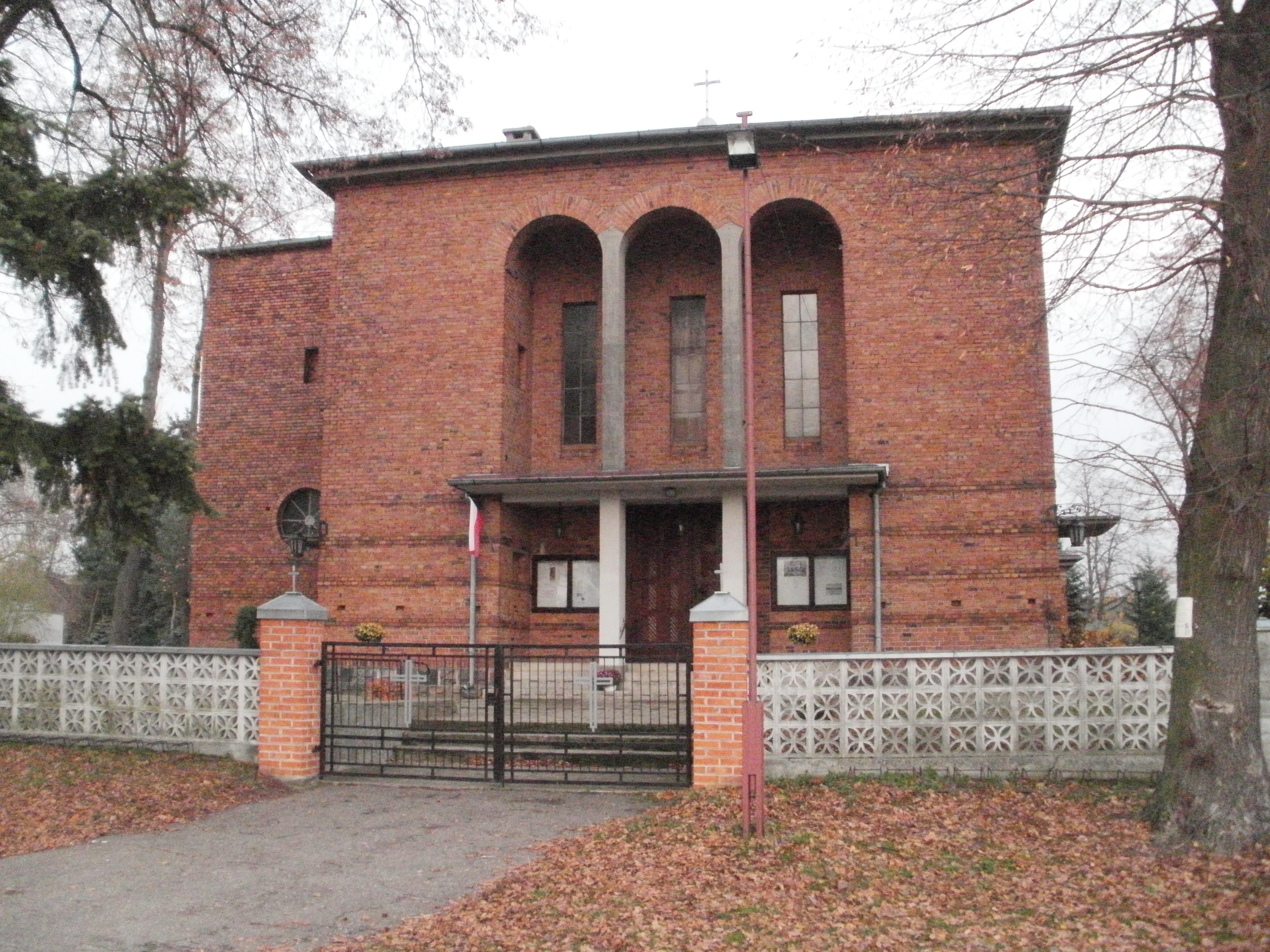
- St. Nicholas Church in Wszembórz
- Location: Wszembórz
- Country: Poland

History
- Founded: 1935-1936

St. Nicholas Church in Wszembórz is a brick Roman Catholic church located in the village of Wszembórz, in Gmina Kołaczkowo, Greater Poland. It is a parish church.

== Description ==
The church was designed by the architect Stefan Cybichowski from Poznań. It is built in the Romanesque Revival architectural style. The construction was started in September 1934 and finished in May 1935 (raw state). In 1941 the occupying Germans converted it, into a garage. After the World War II, the priest Unisław Smaruj fixed the roof, windows and equipped the interior of the church. The church has a capacity of about 1000. Until 1956 the parish was administered by the parish priest of Kołaczkowo. In the early 2010s stained glass windows have been installed.

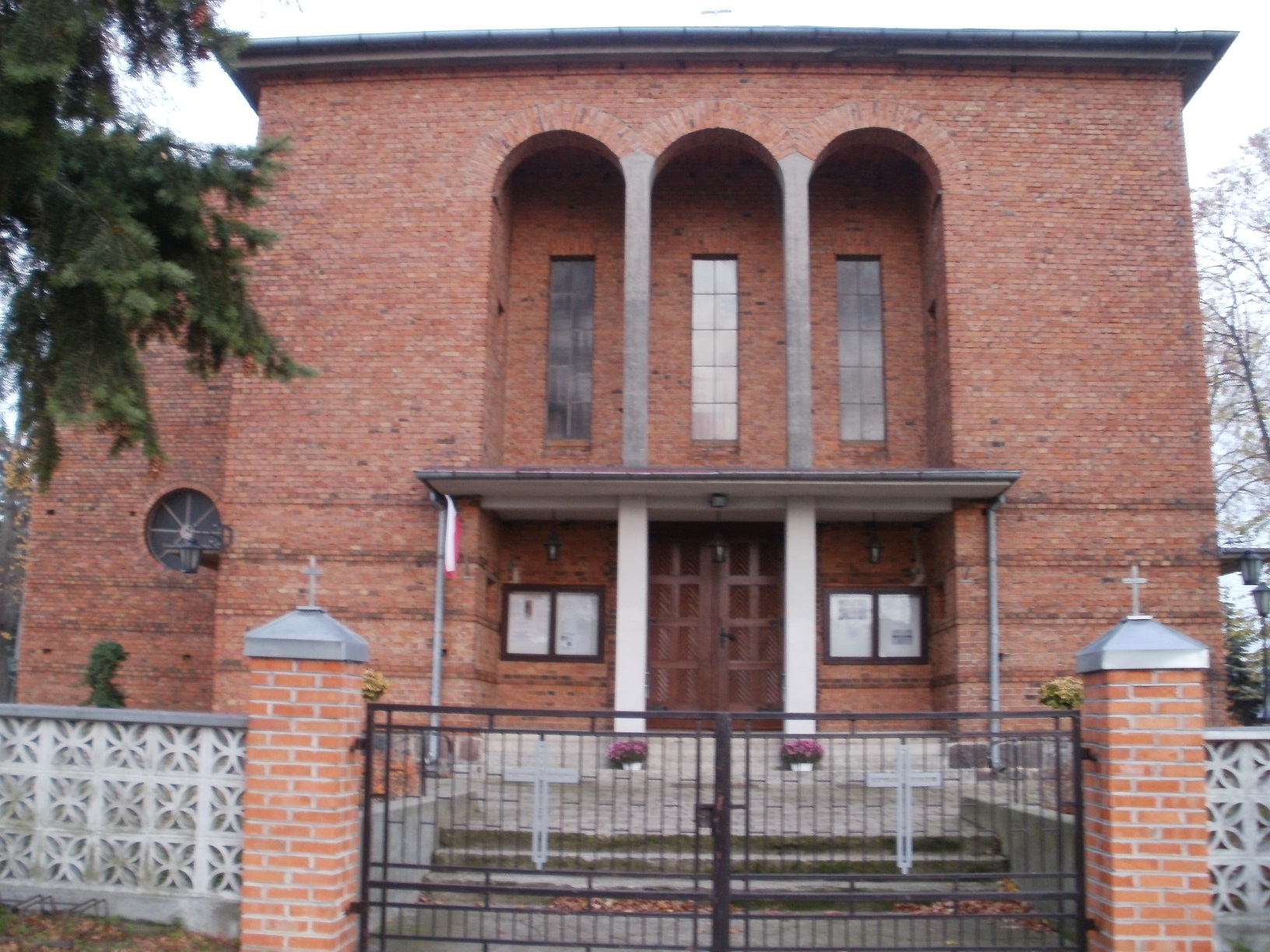
The entrance to the church

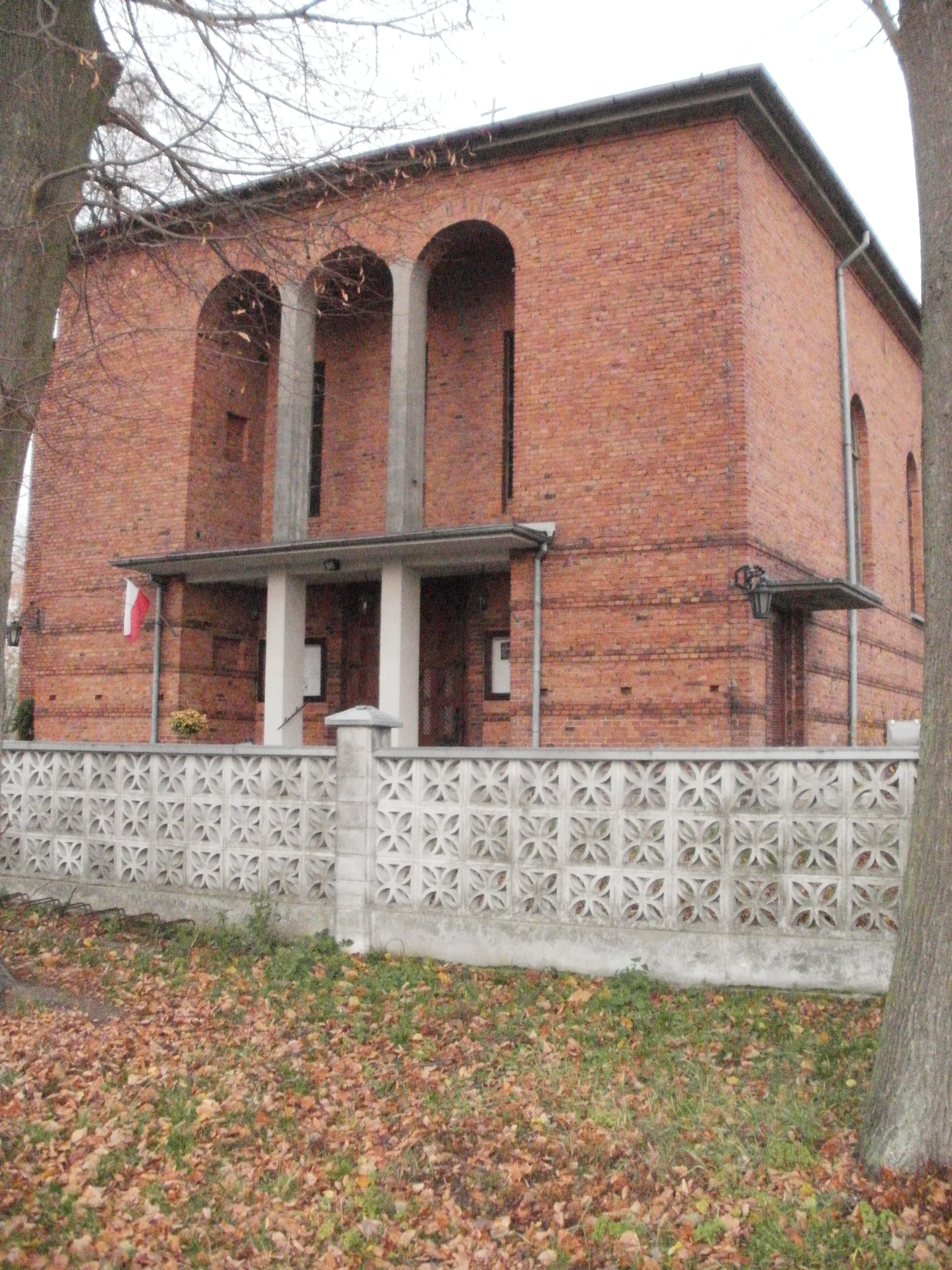
Front

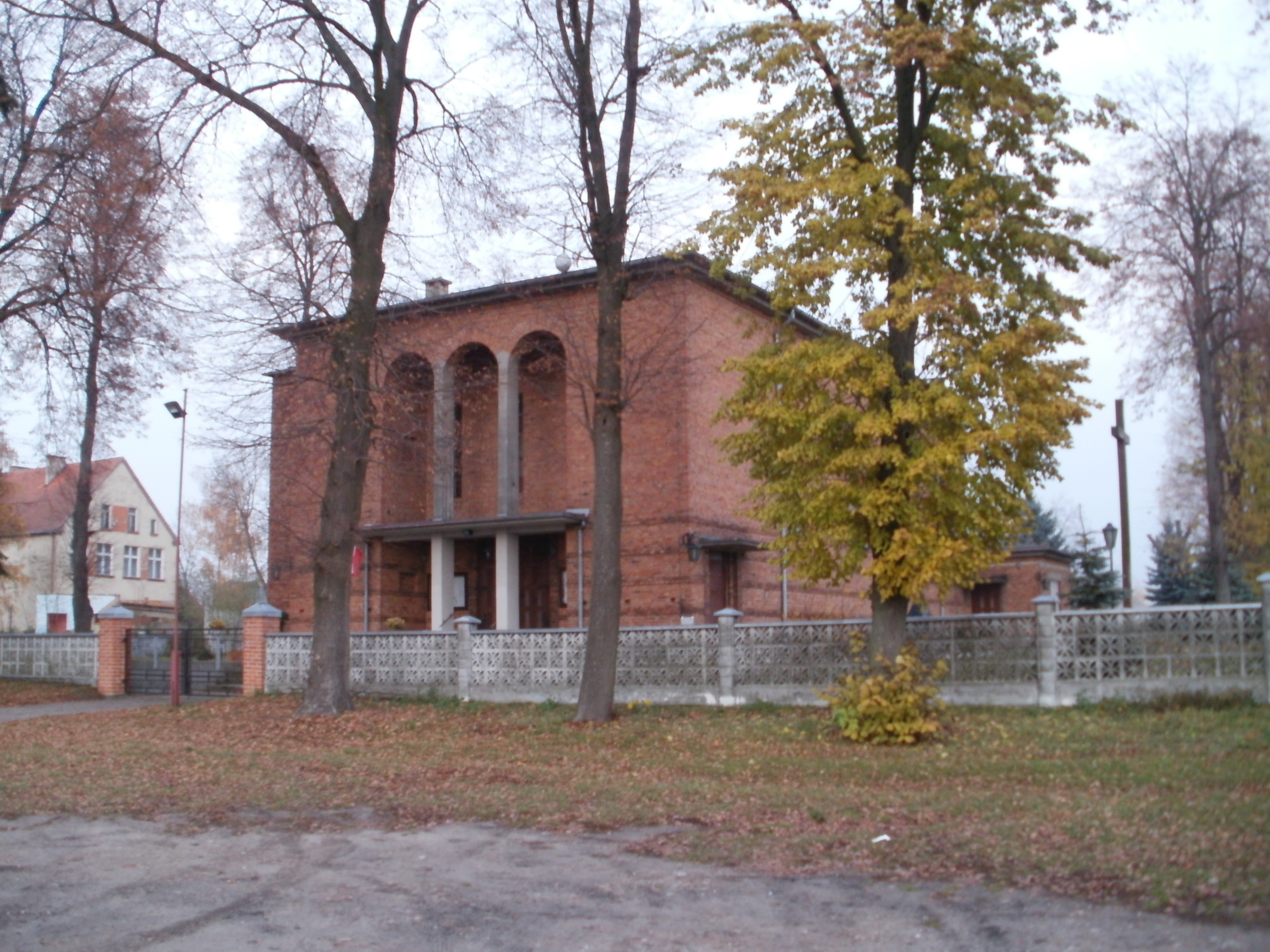
View from a distance

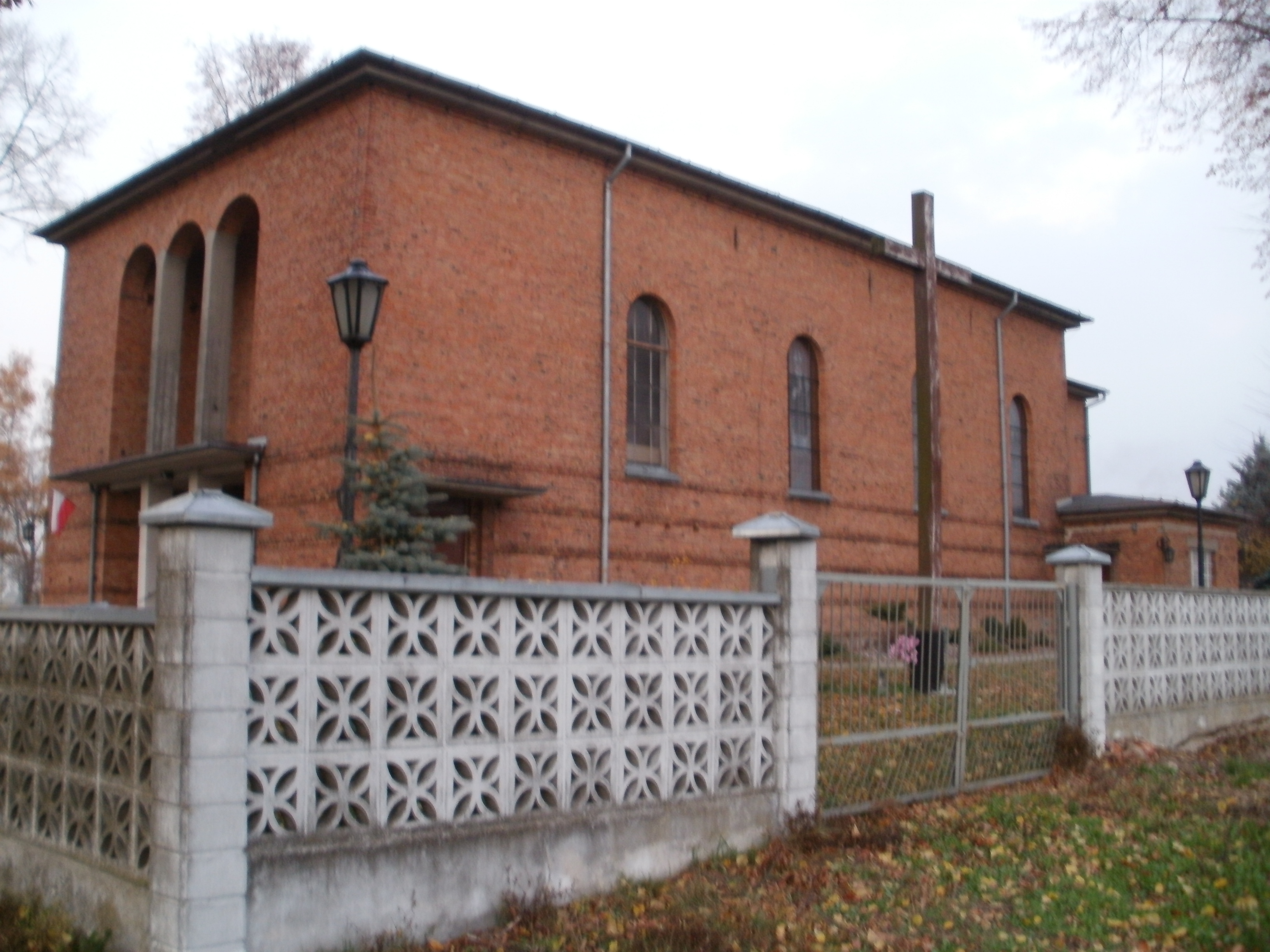
The southern wall

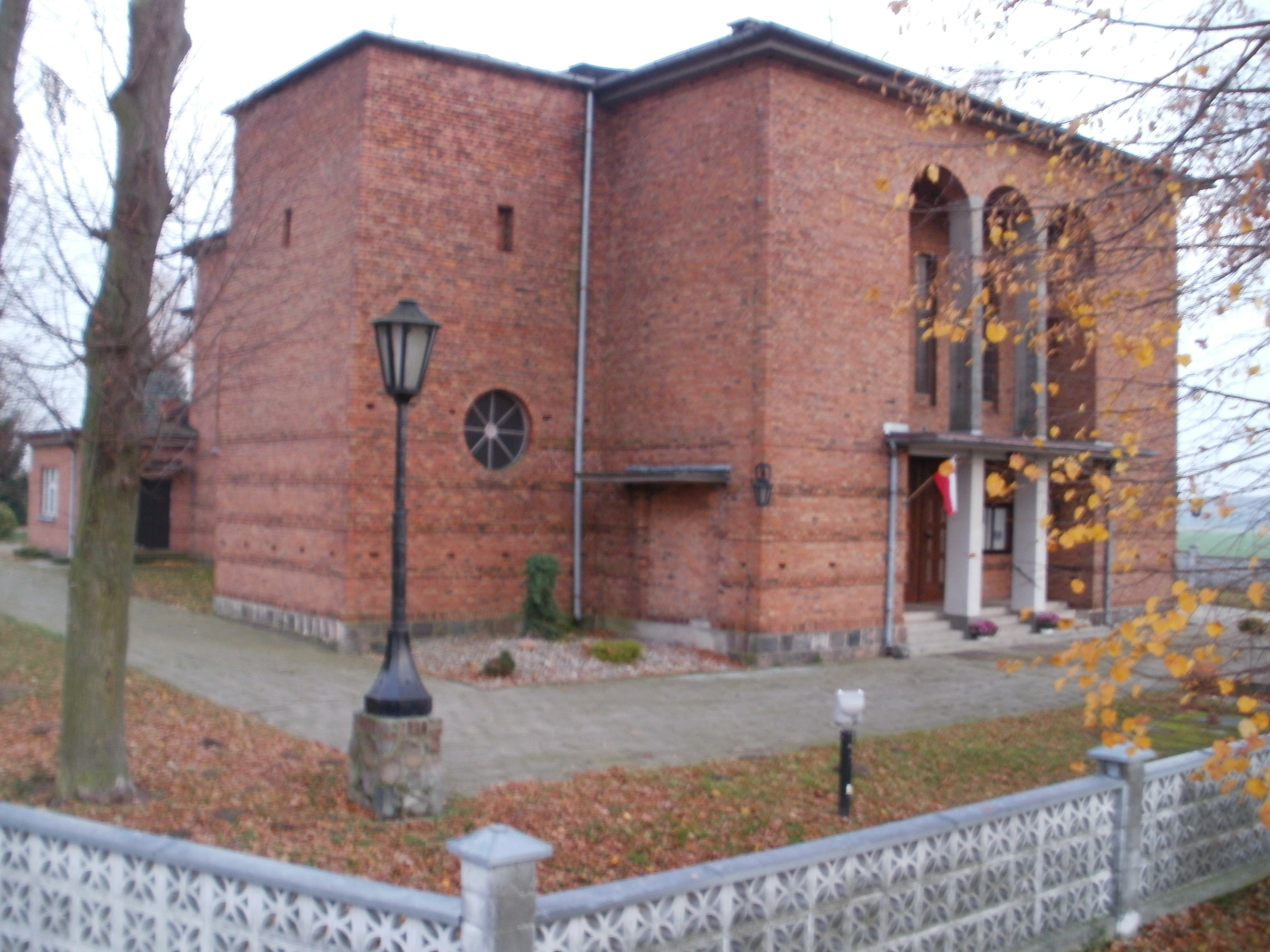
The northern wall

Situation plan of church buildings

The front wall of the church - projection

== Bibliography ==
- Information on the website of the municipality Kołaczkowo (pl)
- "Wszembórz - Gazeta Jubileuszowa 1310-2010".Magazine released on the occasion of the 700th anniversary of Wszembórz. Dariusz Pera
