= Church of the Sacred Heart of Jesus, Grabowo Królewskie =

Church in Poland

Church of the Sacred Heart of Jesus in Grabowo Królewskie
- Kościół Najświętszego Serca Pana Jezusa w Grabowie Królewskim
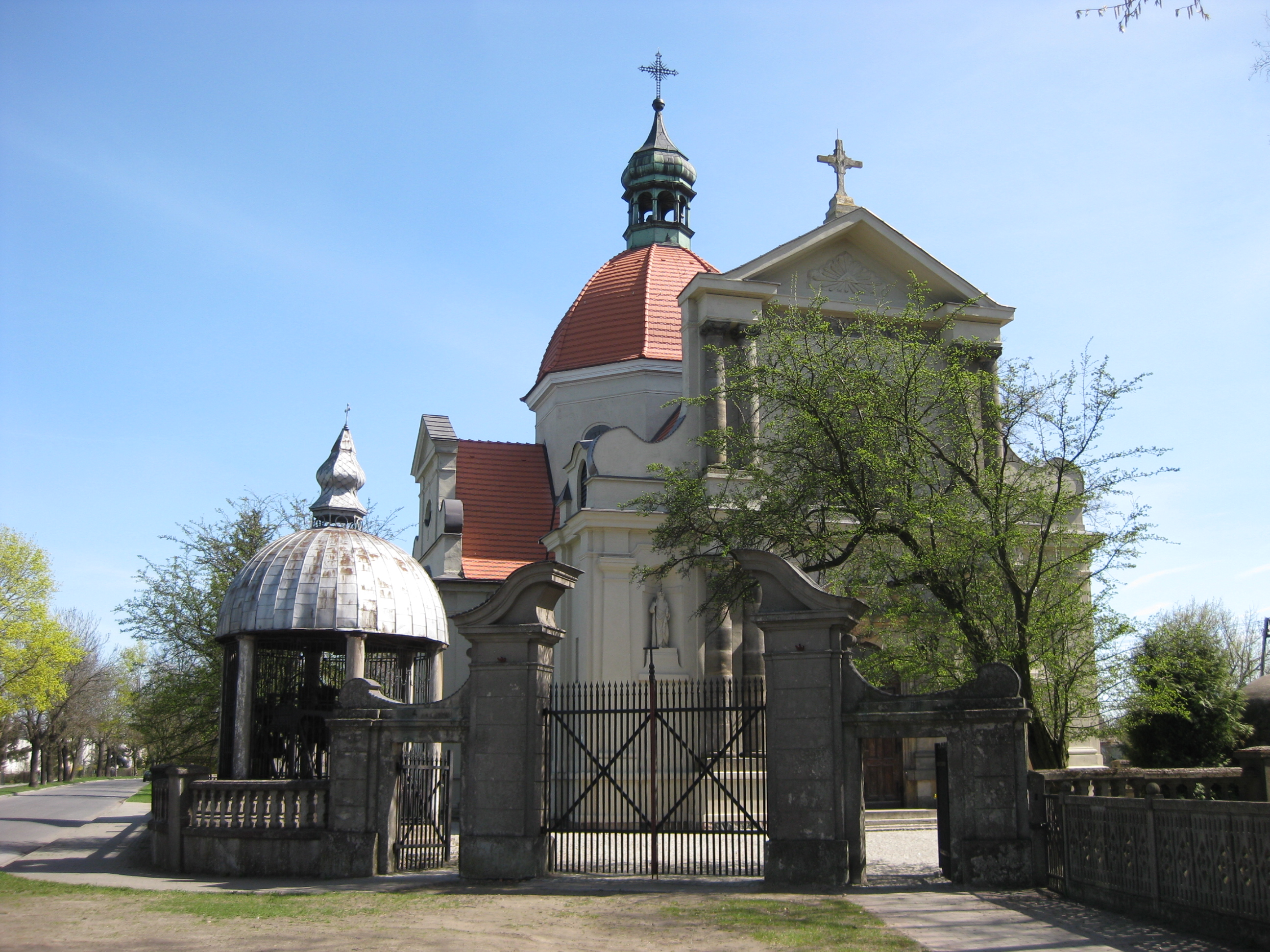

- Location within Poland

Religion
- Affiliation: Roman Catholic
- Diocese: Września
- Province: Archdiocese of Gniezno

Location
- Location: Grabowo Królewskie
- Country: Poland
- Interactive map of Church of the Sacred Heart of Jesus in Grabowo Królewskie
- Coordinates: 52°14′23.04″N 17°36′47.27″E

Architecture
- Architect: Stanisław Mieczkowski
- Style: Baroque Revival architecture
- Completed: 20th century

Specifications
- Direction of façade: south east
- Materials: brick

Church of the Sacred Heart of Jesus in Grabowo Królewskie - church is located in Grabowo Królewskie (Greater Poland Voivodeship, Września County, Kołaczkowo Commune) Church was built between 1925 and 1927. It was built on the site of the old church, which for a period building is still working and only when new already embraced it in its entirety, has been demolished and devotion moved to the current building. During the years Nazi occupation, as the only local church acted legally and openly. At the time it was granted a number of baptisms, marriages and funerals, not just residents Grabowo Królewskie and surrounding villages.

== Description ==
It was designed by Henryk Jackowski("Polichromia”). The vault of the chancel has been exposed sky with golden stars. The founders of the church was married Wanda and Witold Wilkoszewscy, owners of property in Grabowo Królewskie. Architect who designed the church was Stanisław Mieczkowski.

== Gallery ==
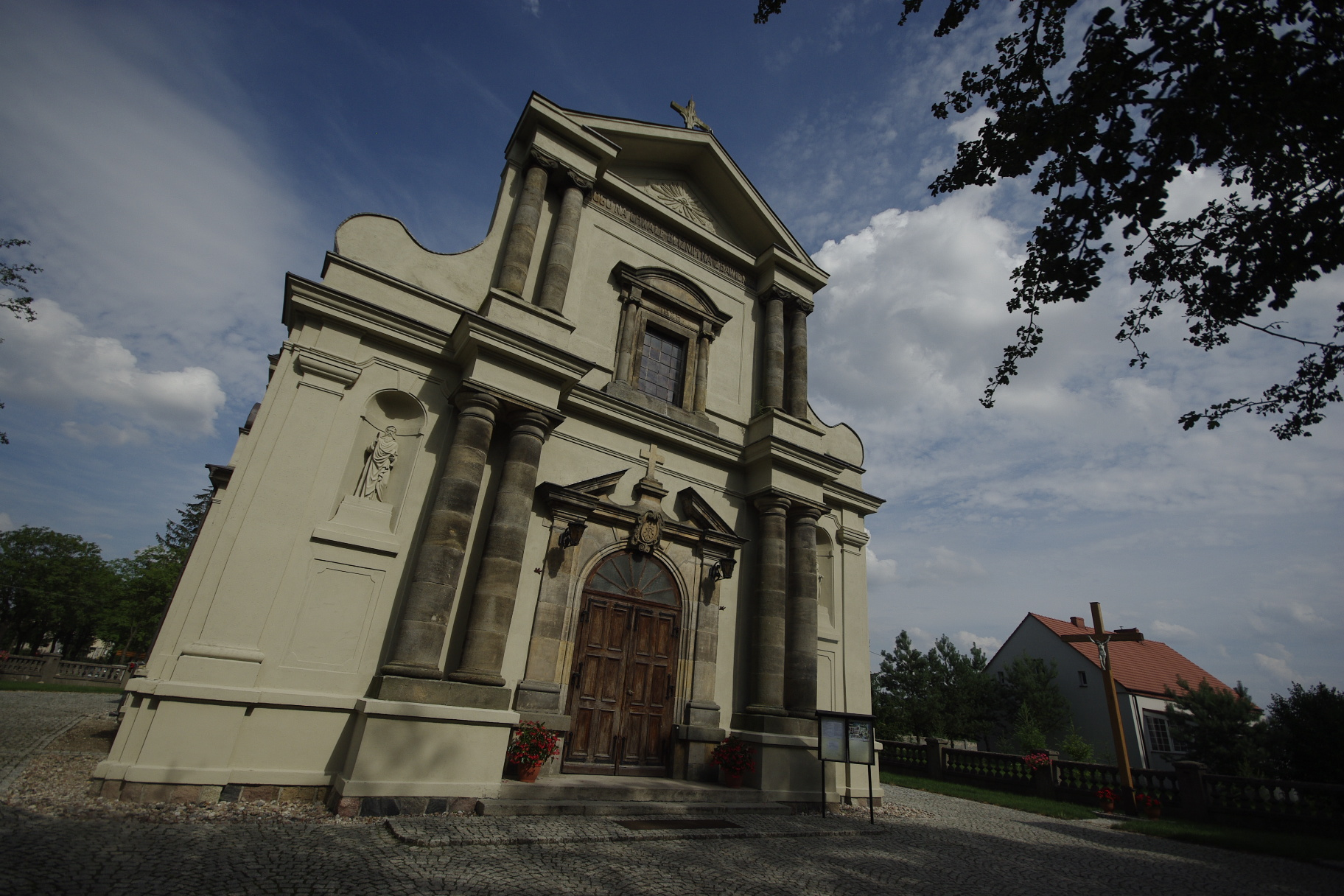
Front of church

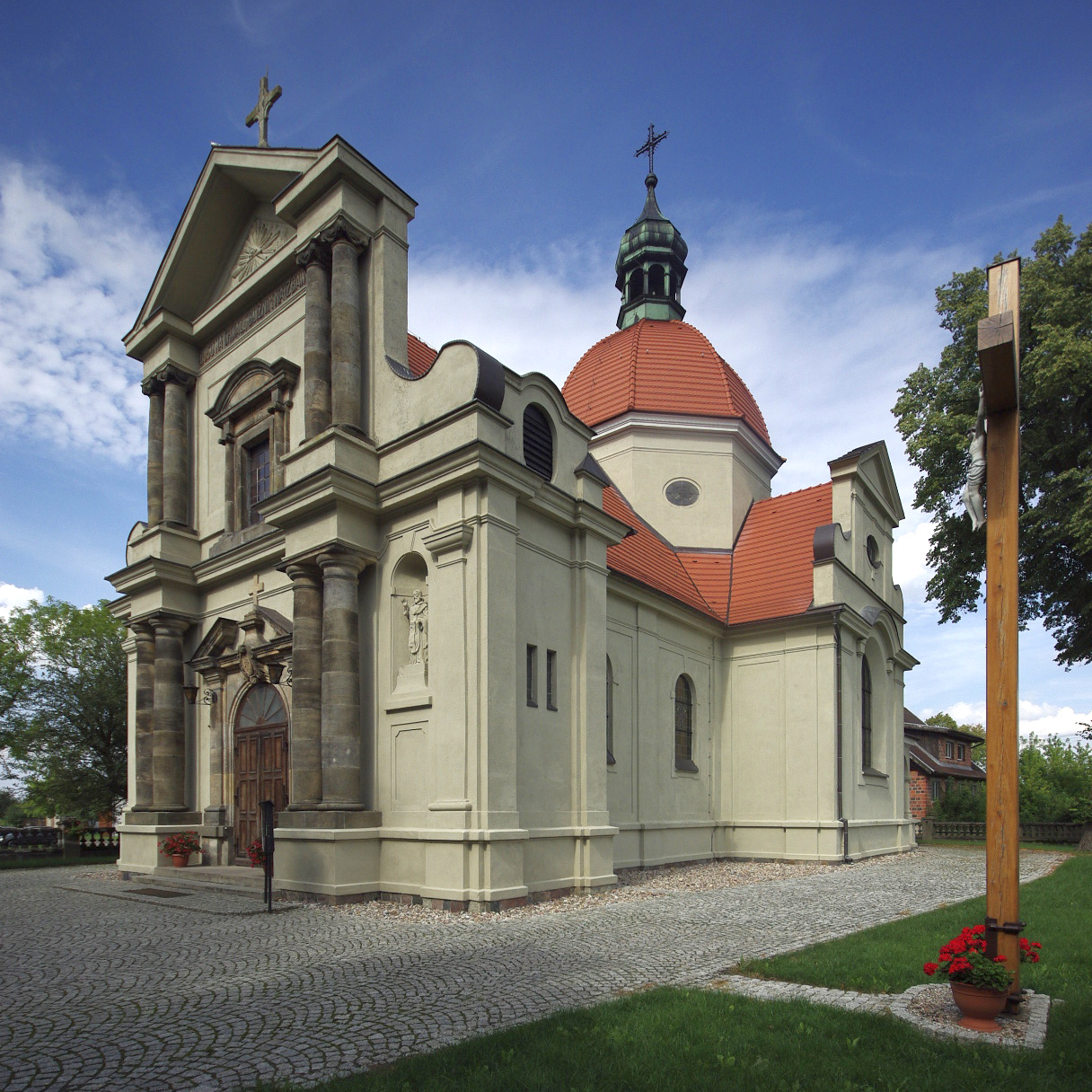
View of church from the south

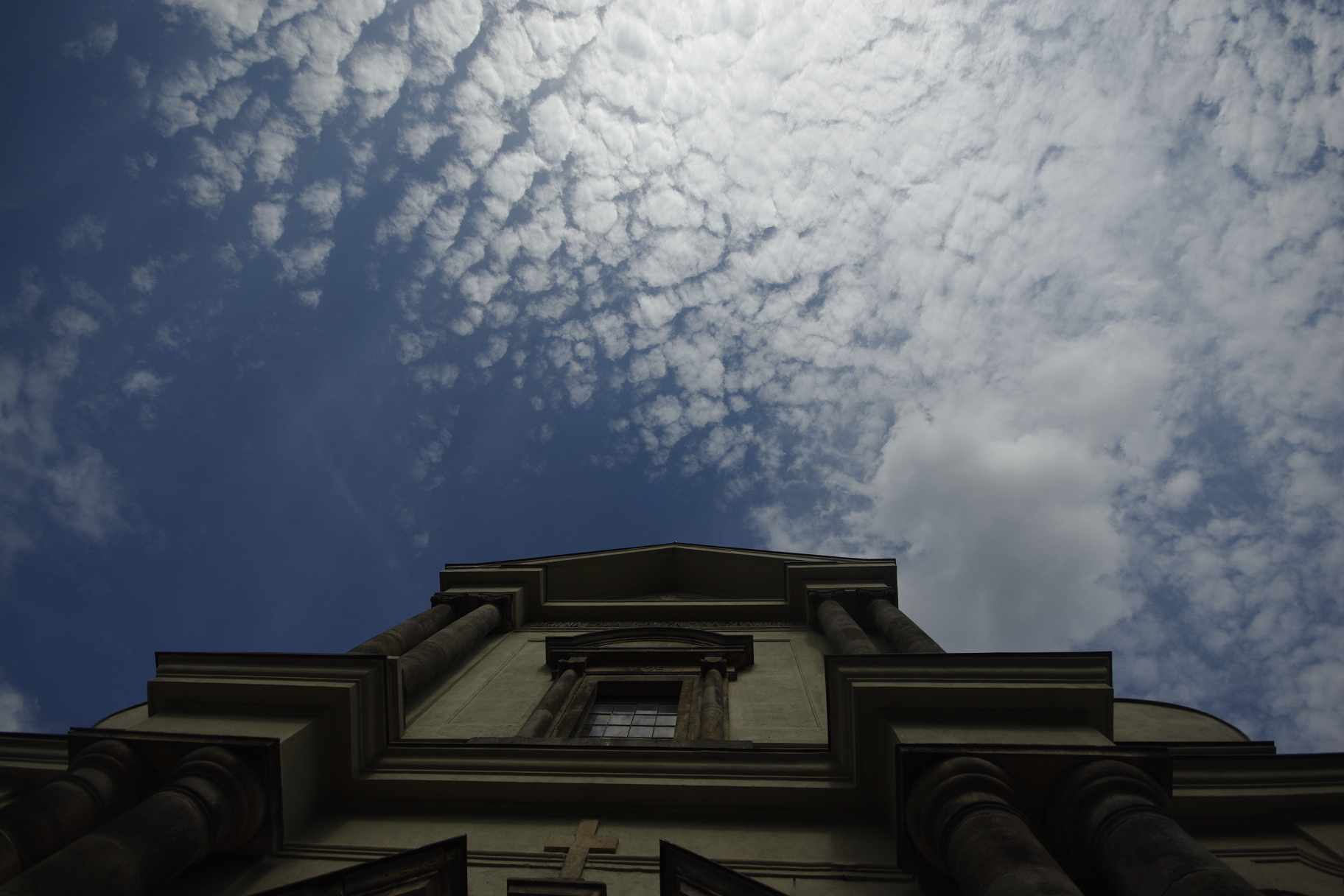
Front of church

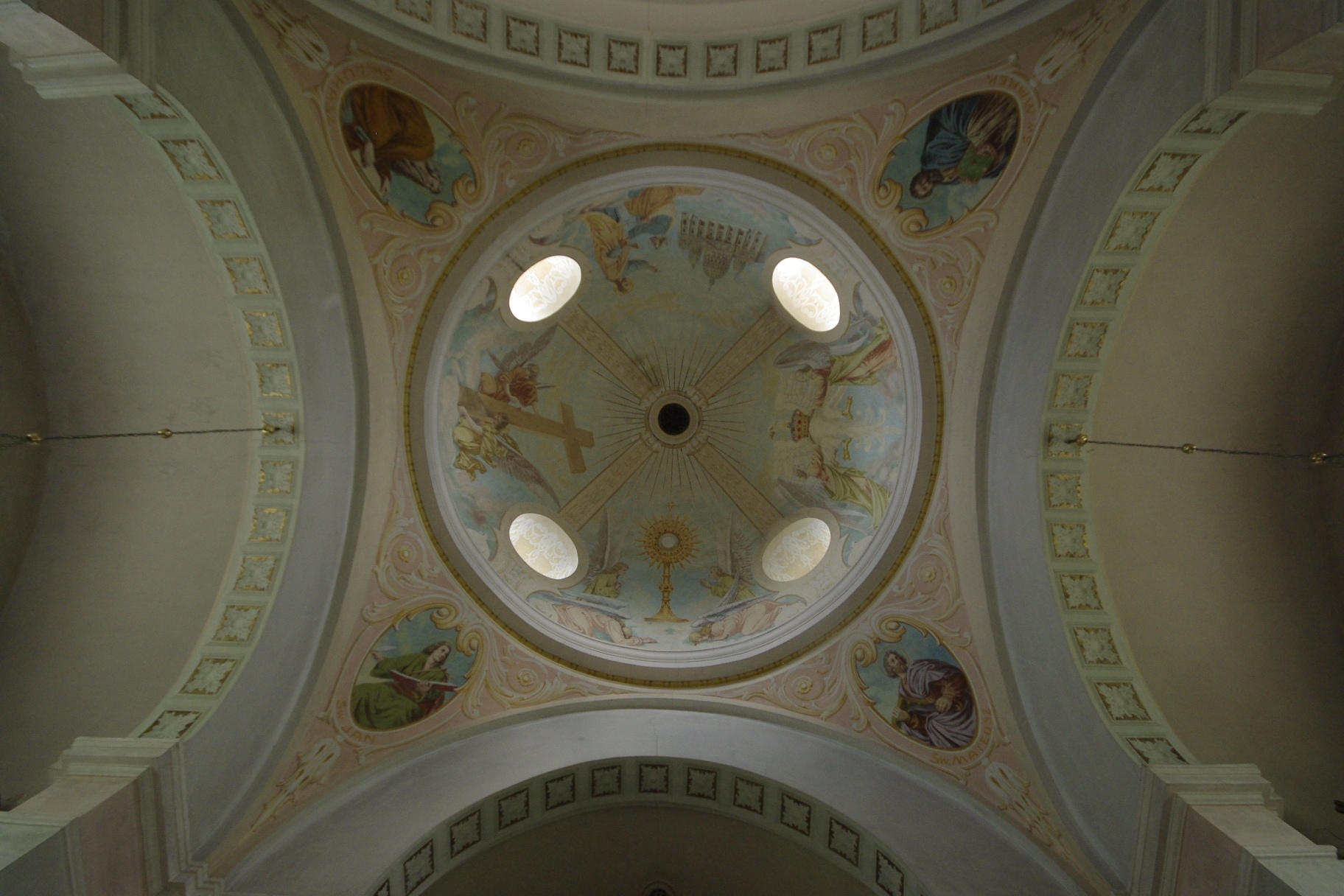
The paintings inside the dome

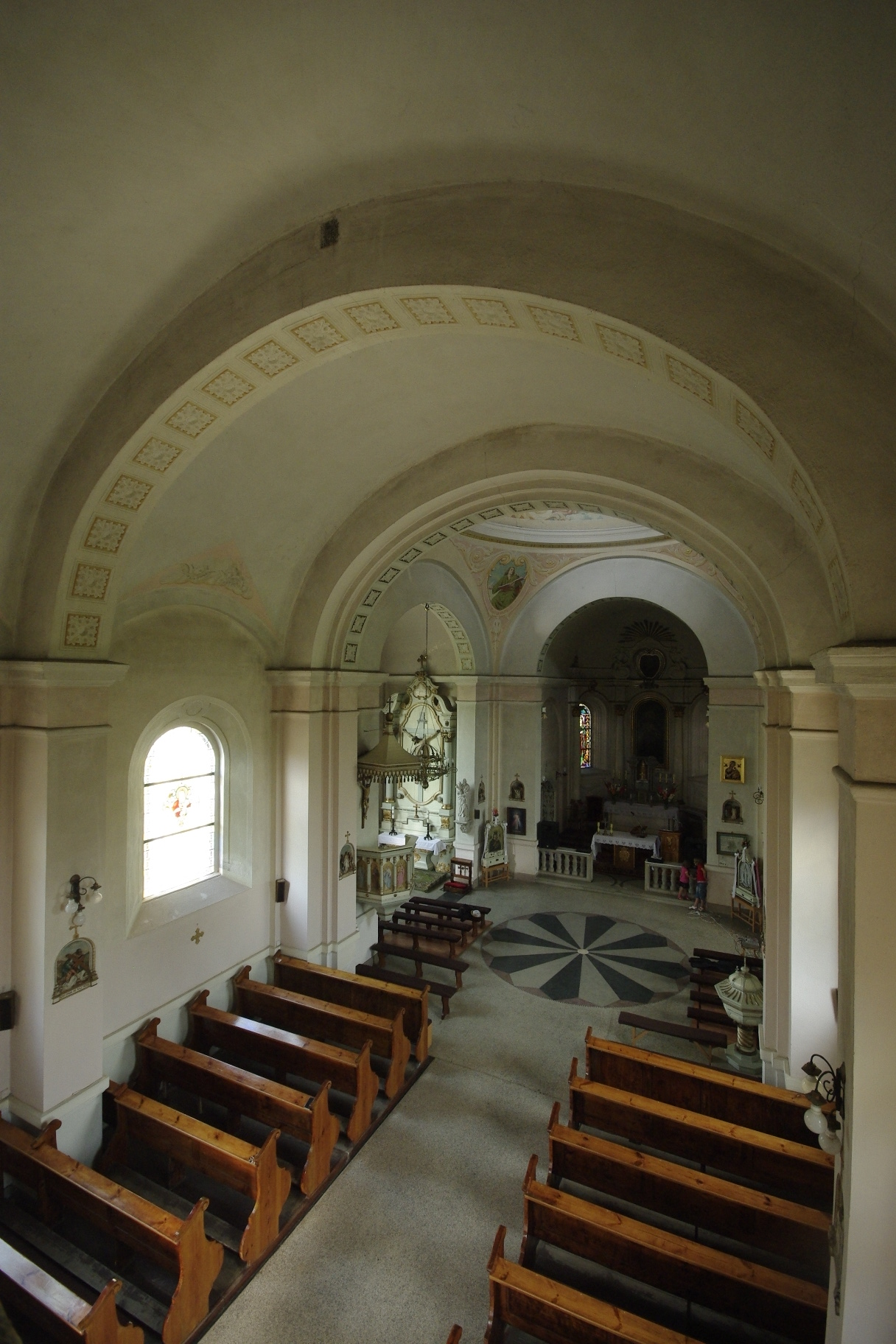
The interior of the church

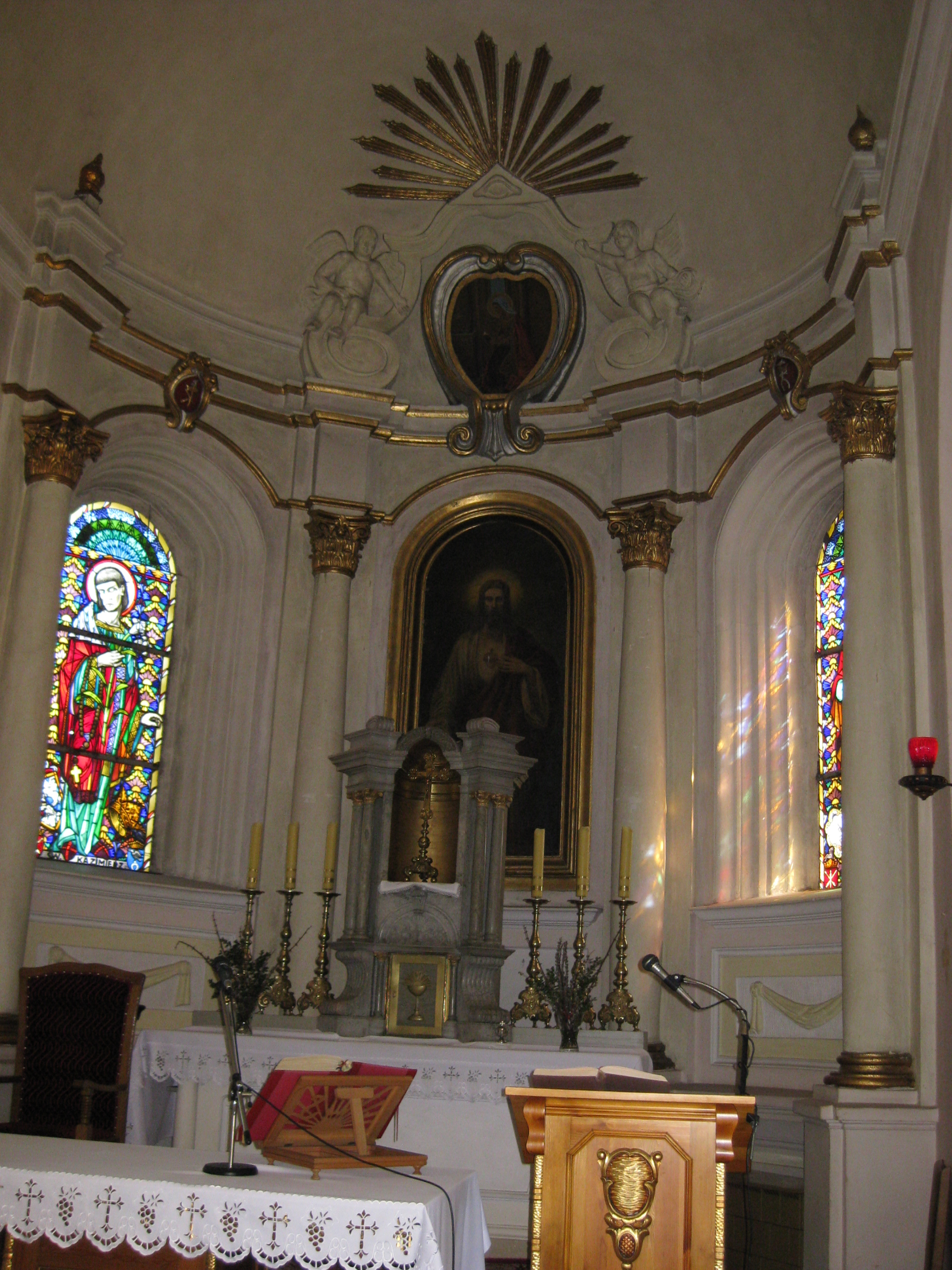
The main altar

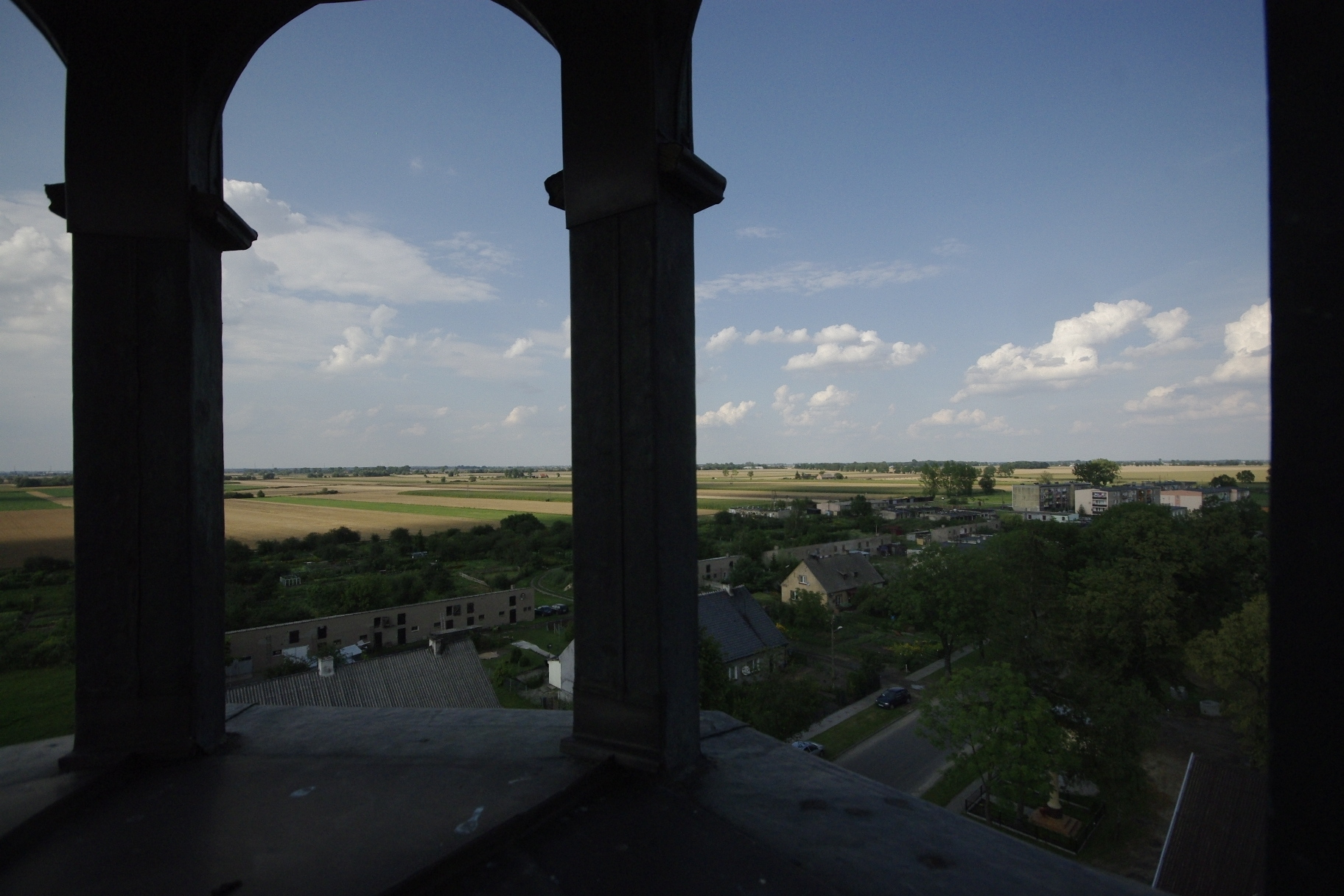
View of the Grabowo Królewskie from the church tower

== Bibliography ==
"Grabowo Królewskie - Tu się dzieje!".
