= Holy Cross Church, Bieganowo =

Coordinates: 52°16′15.50″N 17°40′50.18″E

Holy Cross Church, Bieganowo (in Polish) Kościół Świętego Krzyża w Bieganowie
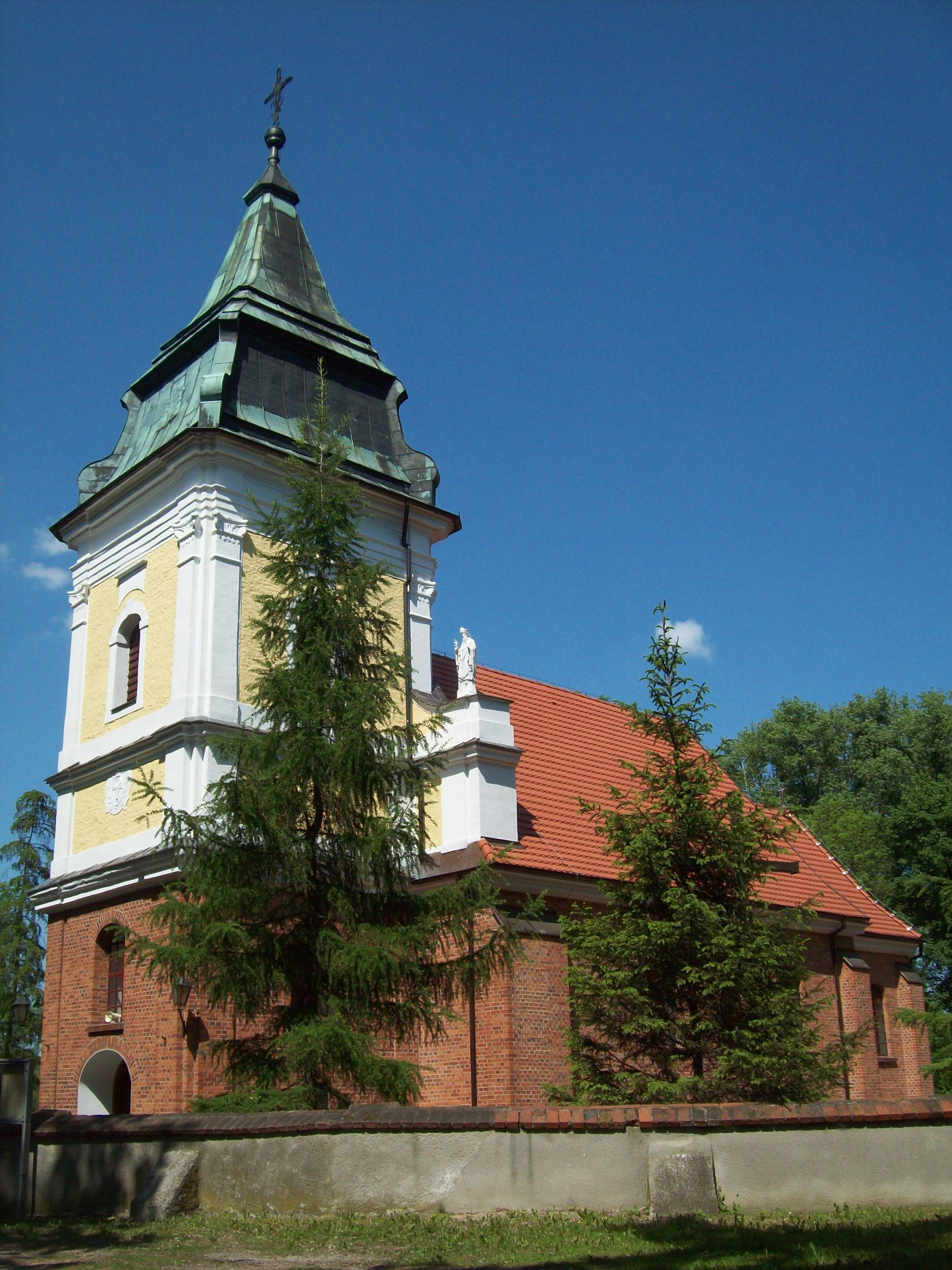

Religion
- Affiliation: Roman Catholic
- Diocese: Września
- Province: Archdiocese of Gniezno

Location
- Location: Bieganowo
- Interactive map of Holy Cross Church, Bieganowo (in Polish) Kościół Świętego Krzyża w Bieganowie

Architecture
- Completed: 13th century

Specifications
- Direction of façade: south west
- Spire: 1
- Materials: wood, brick

Holy Cross Church is a brick built parish church in Bieganowo, Kołaczkowo commune, in Września County, Poland.

== History and description ==
The church in Bieganowo was built around 1210. At that time it was a wooden temple, named "All Saints" church.

In 1729 squire Franciszek Kowalski crest of Korab, began to build a new church, because the previous one was in ruins. In 1731 Bishop Jan Tarło of Poznan consecrated it.

The church is first mentioned in 1737 by the archdeacon of Poznań, Kacykowski, "under the invocation of the Raising of the Holy Cross". However, in documents from the second visitation conducted by the Bishop Franciszek Ksawery de Wrbna Rydzyński in 1777, the temple was named "Finding of the Holy Cross".

By 1799 the temple was again in ruins. Parish priest Mateusz Borowicz, working with the parish patron Jan Bronisz and parishioners rebuilt the entire church, with a new tower, a stone wall on the outside and a wooden interior.

In 1926 the interior of the church was renovated by a new patron, Edward Grabski.

During the Nazi occupation the church was closed. When the church was reopened after the war much of it had been destroyed by dry rot.

On the night of 1 February 1982 at about 11:45PM a fire broke out and the building burned down in about 30 minutes. Only the tower survived. With the consent of church and state, the liturgy was held in the common rooms of the local, state-owned farms until 17 July 1982. On 15 March 1982, construction of the new church began, made possible by the work of parishioners, and with help from State Farm director Bogumił Paul. The church was given new foundations and the original tower was restored. On 21 April 1982 Bishop Józef Glemp, who later became the Polish Primate, assisted by bishop Jan Czerniak, laid the foundation stone along with a brass tube containing documents. By 17 July 1982 the church was completed and, on 25 June 1984, Glemp consecrated the church.

In the tower behind the memorial tablet of 1982 are the entombed remains of the parish priest, Fr. Stanislaw Musial, who was murdered in Dachau concentration camp in 1940 and whose body was returned to his family by the Nazis.

== Bibliography ==
- Chronicle of the parish church of the Holy Cross in Bieganowo in Polish (available from the parish office).
