= 16th Mechanised Division (Poland) =

16th Pomeranian Mechanised Division
- 16. Pomorska Dywizja Piechoty
- Shoulder sleeve insignia
- Active: 1990–present (traditions from 1945)
- Country: Poland
- Branch: Polish Land Forces
- Type: Mechanised infantry
- Size: Division
- Part of: Armed Forces General Command
- Garrison/HQ: Elbląg
- Engagements: Greater Poland Uprising; Polish-Soviet War; Kiev offensive (1920); Battle of Warsaw; Battle of the Niemen River; May Coup (Poland); World War II; Invasion of Poland; Battle of the Bzura; Battle of the Kampinos Forest; Iraq War; War in Afghanistan
- Website: www.wojsko-polskie.pl/16dz/

Commanders
- First: Col. Wojciech Kubiak
- Current: Gen. maj. Krzysztof Radomski

Insignia
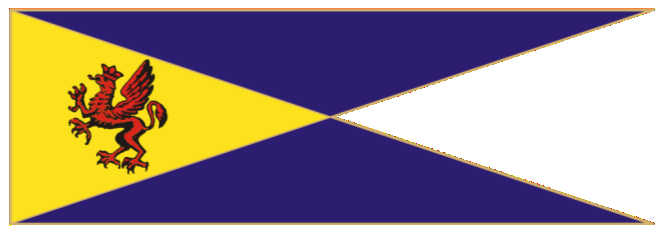
- Beret flash

The 16th Pomeranian Infantry Division (Polish: 16. Pomorska Dywizja Piechoty) is a military unit of the Polish Army. It was first raised on 16 August 1919 during the Polish uprising, before going on to serve during the subsequent war with the Bolsheviks. At the start of World War II the division fought briefly against the advancing German Army before being destroyed on 19 September 1939 after being surrounded in the Kampinos Forest. The division was raised once more in 1945 following the Soviet takeover of Poland; however, it did not see further action during the war. Afterwards it continued to serve, undergoing a number of changes in name and role. Today, it exists as the 16th Mechanised Division.

== History ==
=== Formation ===
The Polish 16th Infantry Division was created on August 16, 1919, during the Greater Poland Uprising under the name of 4th Pomeranian Rifle Division (Polish: 4. Dywizja Strzelców Pomorskich). After the uprising it was officially accepted into the Polish Army and took part in the Polish-Bolshevik War. Commanded by gen.dyw. Kazimierz Ładoś, the division never reached its planned strength and was dispatched to the front without some of its forces. It was then composed of:

- 31st Infantry Brigade (under Col. Mischke)
- 32nd Infantry Brigade (65th Infantry Regiment without 1,5 battalion; under Krauss)
- 16th Artillery Brigade (understrength)

As part of the Polish 4th Army the division took part in the Kiev offensive. Withdrawn to the area of Wieprz, it was attached to Piłsudski's army group to commence the Polish counter-assault during the battle of Warsaw of 1920. It continued its front-line service during the battle of the Niemen River, where it advanced along the Kobryń-Pińsk railway and highway, and on to the signing of the Treaty of Riga. Partially demobilized, it retained its geographical description as an unofficial nickname (thus the division is often referred to as 16. Pomorska Dywizja Piechoty).

=== Inter War Years ===
After the war the division was stationed in its home region of Pomerania. Its regiments were stationed in Starogard and Gniew (65th), Toruń (63rd), Grudziądz (64th and 16th artillery), Kościerzyna, Kartuzy and Chełmno (66th). During the May Coup d'État of 1926 the division remained loyal to the government. Prior to the outbreak of World War II, in June 1939, the division was partially mobilized and, under command of Col. Stanisław Świtalski, attached to Gen. Bołtuć's Operational Group East of the Polish Pomorze Army. It was then dispatched to the area of Grudziądz, where it was to shield the approaches towards Toruń.

=== World War II ===
After the outbreak of the Polish Defensive War the division entered in contact with the enemy on the first hours of the conflict. Attacked by the German XXI Corps of the 3rd Army, the division was pushed back to the other side of the Osa river. Suffering from a nervous breakdown, the commanding officer ordered his forces to retreat, but was soon replaced with Col. Zygmunt Szyszko-Bohusz, until then the deputy commander of the division. The latter prepared the plan of a counter-attack on the flank of the advancing Germans, but the fast pace of their advance cut out the Pomorze Army in two and the attack was called off.

After a successful withdrawal through Włocławek (September 7) and Toruń, the division took part in the battle of Bzura. It successfully assaulted the German positions and liberated Łowicz, the main pivot of the German defences in the area. However, in the effect of conflicting orders from Gen. Władysław Bortnowski, the division was then withdrawn back to its initial positions on the northern bank of the Bzura river, and was then ordered to recapture the town again. The task was accomplished, but this time with much higher casualties. After heavy street-to-street fighting, the town was almost completely razed to the ground and the division was reduced to merely a third of its initial strength and had to be withdrawn from combat. The remnants of the division broke through from the battle, but were then surrounded and destroyed in the battle of the Kampinos Forest of September 19.

During World War II, the traditions of the 16th Pomeranian were inherited by the Polish 16th Pomeranian Infantry Brigade fighting as part of Gen. Władysław Anders' Polish II Corps. After the Soviet take-over of Poland, the division was recreated in Gdańsk in 1945. It was formed too late to take part in World War II and instead it served in a variety of roles in the rear.

=== Post World War II ===
Renamed to 16th Kashubian Infantry Division, in 1949 it was reformed into an Armoured Division and then

The division was re-formed as part of the People's Army of Poland in July 1945 on the basis of four reserve infantry regiments. Divisional headquarters was established at Gdansk-Wrzeszcz. Initially, its task was primarily reconstruction in the city and protecting property from theft.

In the summer of 1945 the division consisted of headquarters in Gdańsk, the 51st Infantry Regiment at Malbork, the 55th Infantry Regiment at Elbląg, the 60th Infantry Regiment at Gdańsk, the 41st Light Artillery Regiment at Gdańsk, the 20 Independent Motorized Division Artillery, which moved twice before being established at Elbląg, the 47th Sapper Battalion at Gdansk-Wrzeszcz, the 12 Independent Communications Battalion in Gdansk-Wrzeszcz, and several smaller units. Since 1945 the division went through various reorganisations and changes of station. In 1947, it was given its distinctive name "Kashubian".

In 1949, 16th Kashubian Infantry Division was reorganised as the 16th Kashubian Tank Division and moved to Elbląg and Braniewo, Malbork, and Tczew, part of the Pomeranian Military District. In 1952 it was reorganised as the 16th Mechanised Division. In 1955 it became a tank division again and in this form served until 1989, when it was reorganised as a mechanised division once more.

From January 11, 2007 to December 31, 2010, the 14th Anti-Tank Artillery Regiment (Poland) was within the structures of the 16th Pomeranian Mechanized Division "King Kazimierz Jagiellończyk".

== Organization ==
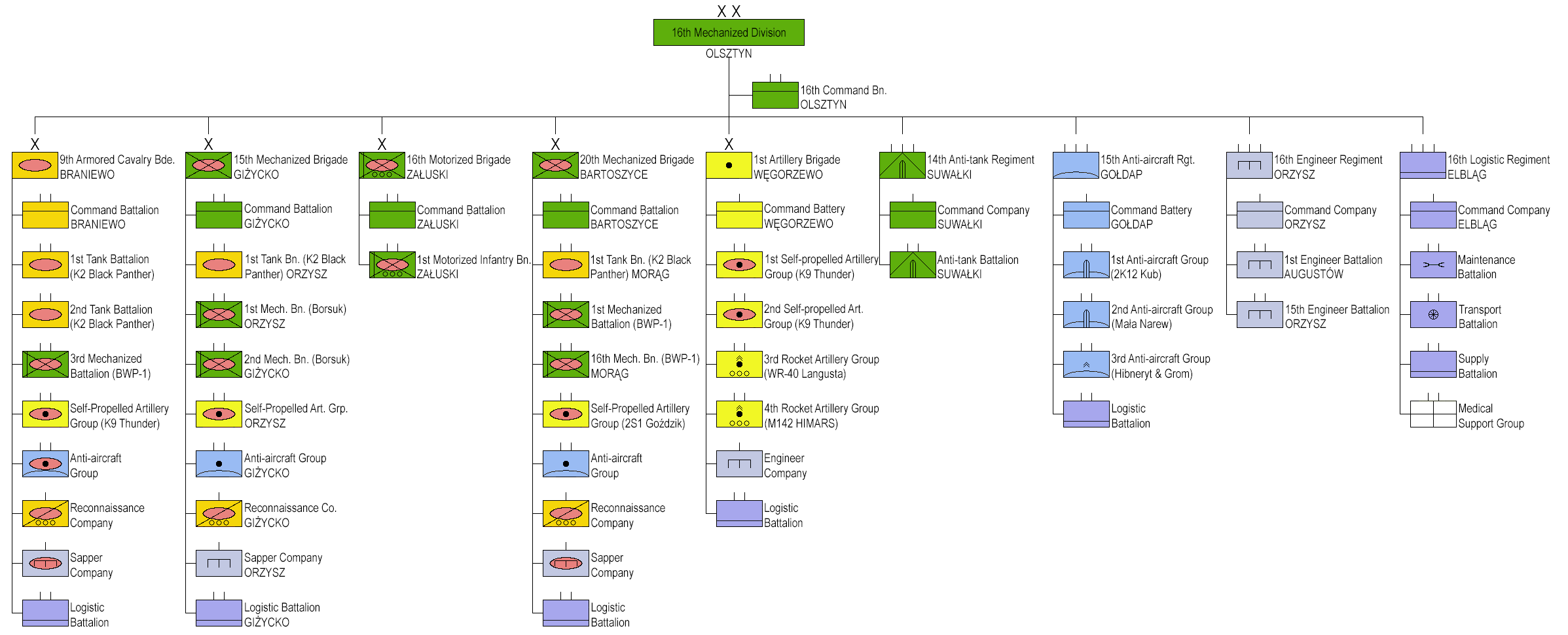
16th Mechanised Division organisation (click image to enlarge)

16th Mechanised Division units 2024

As of 2025 the 16th "Pomeranian" Mechanised Division consists of the following units:

- 16th Pomeranian Mechanised Division, in Olsztyn
  - 16th Command Battalion, in Olsztyn
  - 9th Armoured Cavalry Brigade, in Braniewo
  - 15th Mechanised Brigade, in Giżycko
  - 16th Motorized Brigade, in Załuski (formation commenced on 18 March 2024)
  - 20th Mechanised Brigade, in Bartoszyce
  - 1st Artillery Brigade, in Węgorzewo
  - 14th Anti-tank Regiment, in Suwałki (being formed)
  - 15th Air-Defence Regiment, in Gołdap
  - 16th Sapper Regiment, in Orzysz (being formed)
  - 16th Logistic Regiment, in Elbląg

The divisions is equipped with PT-91 Twardy and T-72M1Z tanks, BWP-1 infantry fighting vehicles and 2S1 Gvozdika self-propelled artillery; however it is currently re-equipping with the K2 Black Panther. The 11th Artillery Regiment is equipped with WR-40 Langusta multiple rocket launchers and an operational group with 24 AHS Krab.

According to Joint Force Command Brunssum's Northern Star newsletter of February 2017, the division will be reorganised as the new Multi-National Division North East, agreed on by NATO at the NATO Warsaw Summit.

== Commander ==
- Colonel John Bołbat (1945)
- Col.. Stanislaw Edward Grodzki (1946)
- Brig. Sigmund Duszyński (1947)
- Brig. Stanislaw Daniluk-Daniłowski (1947)
- Col. Kazimierz Pest (1948-1949)

== See also ==
- Polish army order of battle in 1939
- Polish contribution to World War II
- List of Polish divisions in World War II
