= Stanisław Świtalski =

Polish colonel

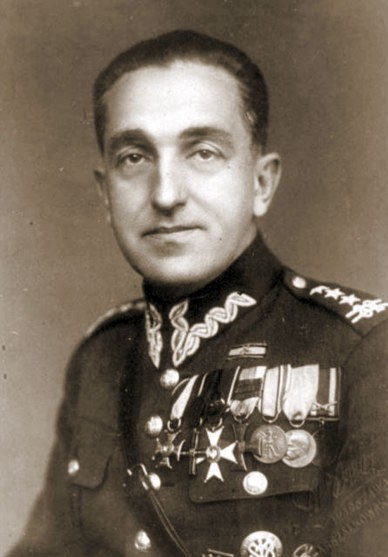
- Born: March 28, 1890; Gródek Jagielloński, Kingdom of Galicia and Lodomeria, Austria-Hungary
- Died: September 19, 1939 (aged 49); Famułki Królewskie, Białystok Voivodeship, Poland
- Burial place: Powązki Military Cemetery, Warsaw, Poland
- Education: University of Lviv
- Military career
- Allegiance: Austria-Hungary; Poland
- Branch: Polish Legions; Polish Armed Forces
- Service years: 1914–1939
- Rank: Chartered Infantry Colonel
- Units: 9th Infantry Division; Corps District Command No. VII; 16th Pomeranian Infantry Division
- Conflicts: World War I Polish–Ukrainian War: Battle of Lemberg (WIA); Polish–Soviet War; World War II: Battle of Grudziądz

Stanisław Jan Ferdynand Świtalski was a Polish colonel who was a Certified officer that served in World War I, the Polish–Ukrainian War and in the Invasion of Poland.

== Biography ==
He was the son of counselor Józef Świtalski and Helena née Chądzyńska. After graduating from the folk school in Gródek and the gymnasium in Lviv (1908), he entered the University of Lviv. Before World War I, he graduated from the Faculty of Law of the University of Lviv (1913). From August 1914 to July 1917 in the Polish Legions. He fought in the ranks of the 2nd infantry regiment in which, he commanded a platoon and then a company. He then transferred to the 6th Infantry Regiment, he fought over Styr and Stochod. After the Oath crisis, Świtalski was interned in Beniaminów and from 1918, he served in the Polish Military Organization.

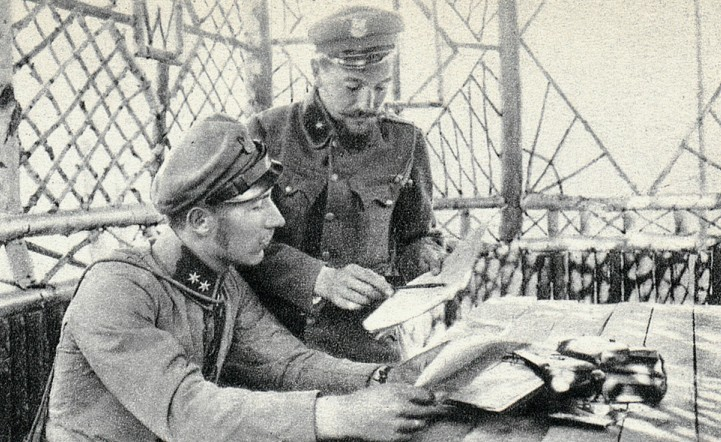
Stanisław Świtalski (on the right) and Lt. Józef Gigiel-Melechowicz during their period of service in the Legions

From November 3, 1918, he was serving in the Polish Armed Forces, he took part as the commander of the staff company of the Lwów Brigade in the Battle of Lemberg that year. He was wounded during the fighting. During the Polish–Soviet War, he commanded a battalion in the 6th Infantry Regiment of the Legions, and then served as deputy commander of this regiment in the years 1920–1922.

In the years 1922–1923 he was a student of the Training Course at the Wyższa Szkoła Wojenna in Warsaw. On October 15, 1923, after completing the course and obtaining the academic title of Certified officer, he was assigned to the 20th Infantry Division for the position of chief of staff. On November 1, 1923, he was assigned to the Army Inspectorate No. I in Vilnius as the 2nd clerk. On September 1, 1926, he was transferred to the composition of the general to work at the General Inspector of the Armed Forces, Brigadier General Stanisław Burhardt-Bukacki to the position of the first officer of the staff. On March 31, 1927, he was transferred to the 82nd infantry regiment in Brest to the position of the regiment commander. In October 1931 he was appointed commander of the infantry division of the 9th Infantry Division in Siedlce. In 1934 he was transferred to the Corps District Command No. VII in Poznań to the position of the assistant commander for supplements. On April 2, 1938, he was appointed commander of the 16th Pomeranian Infantry Division in Grudziądz.

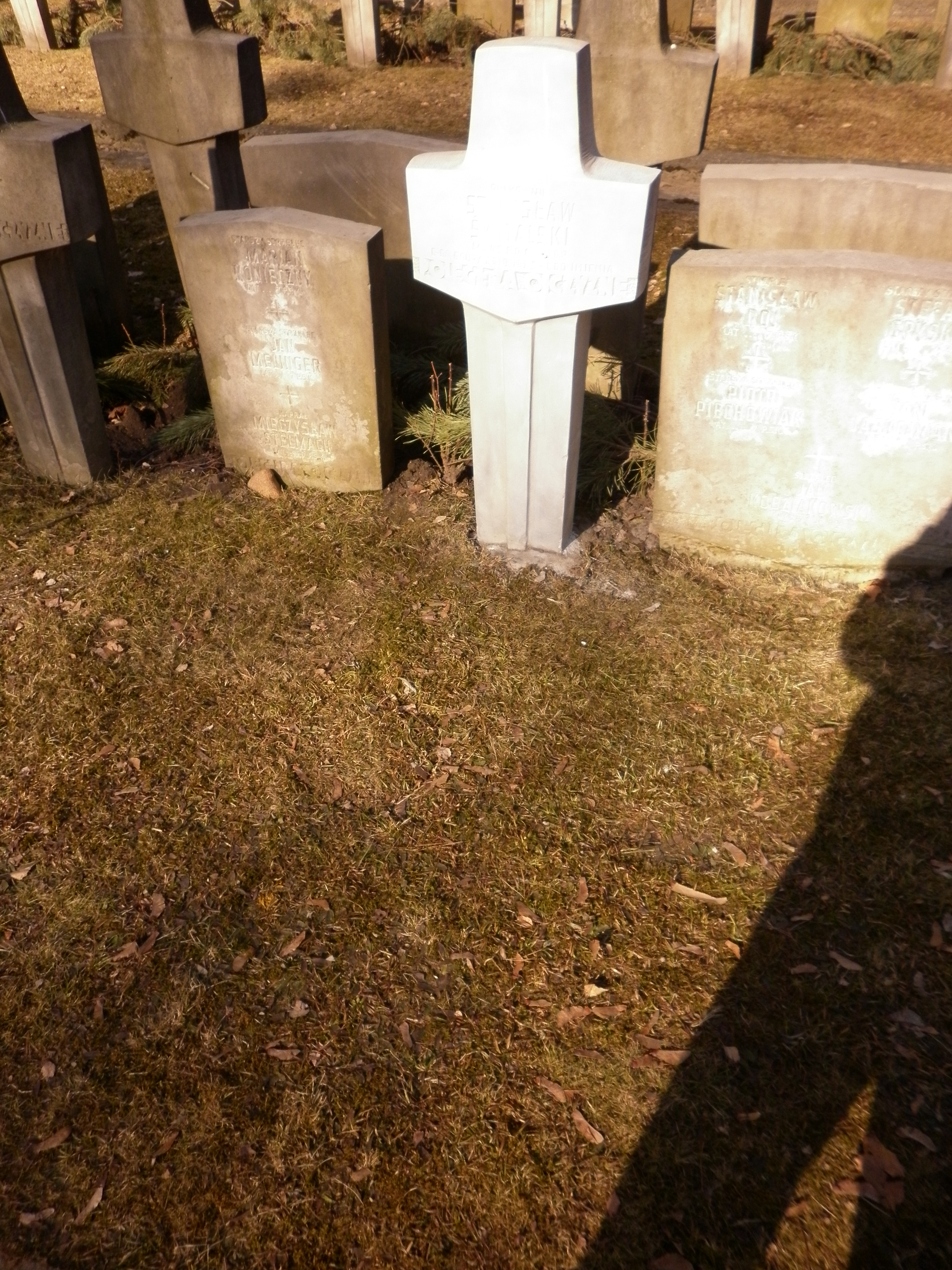
The grave of Stanisław Świtalski

On September 2, 1939, due to ineffective command, he was dismissed from the position of the division commander and placed at the disposal of the commander of the Pomorze Army. On September 7, he took command of an improvised combat group consisting of guard, stage, Military Training and survivors from other army units. On September 10, this group, after joining the 3rd Battalion of the 144th Infantry Regiment which consisted of about three infantry battalions and was tasked with maintaining the crossing over the Bzura River in Sochaczew. While the remnants of the group were breaking through the Kampinos Forest, Świtalski was killed in a fight with the Germans in the vicinity of the Krzywa Góra gamekeeper's lodge. Initially buried at the place of his death, in 1951 the ashes were exhumed and he was buried at the Powązki Military Cemetery (section B10-6-9).

== Awards ==
- Virtuti Militari, Silver Cross (1921)
- Cross of Independence (June 6, 1931)
- Order of Polonia Restituta, Officer's Cross
- Cross of Valour (Awarded 4 times, 2nd Cross awarded in 1921)
- Commemorative Medal for the War of 1918–1921
- Medal of the Decade of Regained Independence
- Wound Decoration
- Commemorative Badge of the Inspector General of the Armed Forces (May 12, 1936)

=== Foreign Awards ===
- Latvia: Medal of the 10th Anniversary of the Independence War (1929)
