= Wszembórz =

- Village
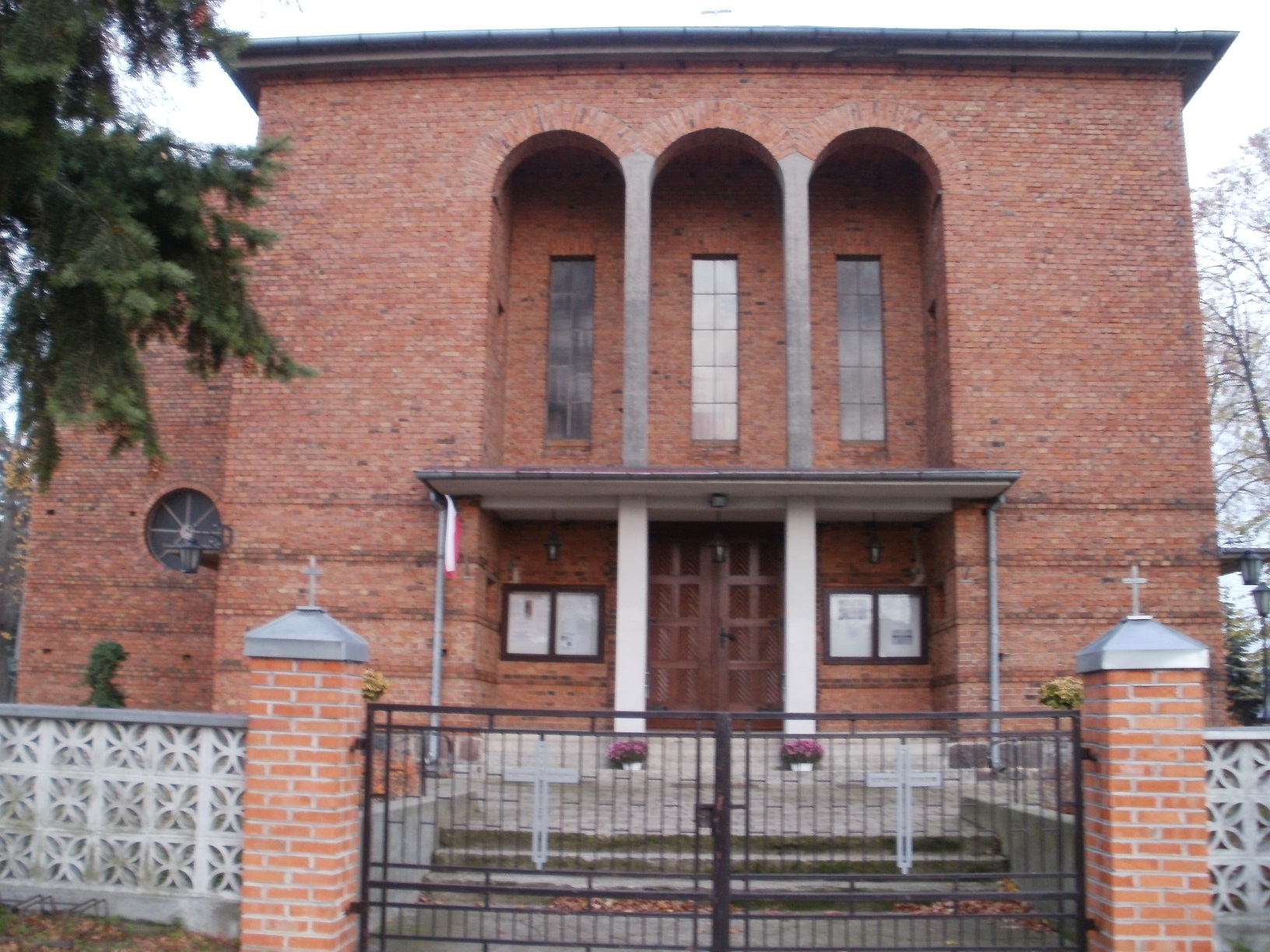

- Location within Poland
- Coordinates: 52°11′12″N 17°37′36″E
- Country: Poland
- Voivodeship: Greater Poland
- County: Września
- Gmina: Kołaczkowo

Wszembórz [ˈfʂɛmbuʂ] is a village in the administrative district of Gmina Kołaczkowo, within Września County, Greater Poland Voivodeship, in west-central Poland.

== See also ==
- Church of St. Nicholas in Wszembórz
