= Borzykowo, Greater Poland Voivodeship =

Borzykowo
- Village
- Location within Poland
- Coordinates: 52°12′N 17°40′E
- Country: Poland
- Voivodeship: Greater Poland
- County: Września
- Gmina: Kołaczkowo

Borzykowo [bɔʐɨˈkɔvɔ] is a village in the administrative district of Gmina Kołaczkowo, within Września County, Greater Poland Voivodeship, in west-central Poland.

== Transport ==
Borzykowo lies at the intersection of voivodeship roads 442 and 441.

The nearest railway station is in Wrzesnia.
