= Cieśle Małe =

- Village
- Location within Poland
- Coordinates: 52°11′N 17°39′E
- Country: Poland
- Voivodeship: Greater Poland
- County: Września
- Gmina: Kołaczkowo

Cieśle Małe (German 1939-1945 Ostfelde) [ˈt͡ɕɛɕlɛ ˈmawɛ] is a village in the administrative district of Gmina Kołaczkowo, within Września County, Greater Poland Voivodeship, in west-central Poland.
