= Bieganowo, Września County =

Bieganowo
- Village
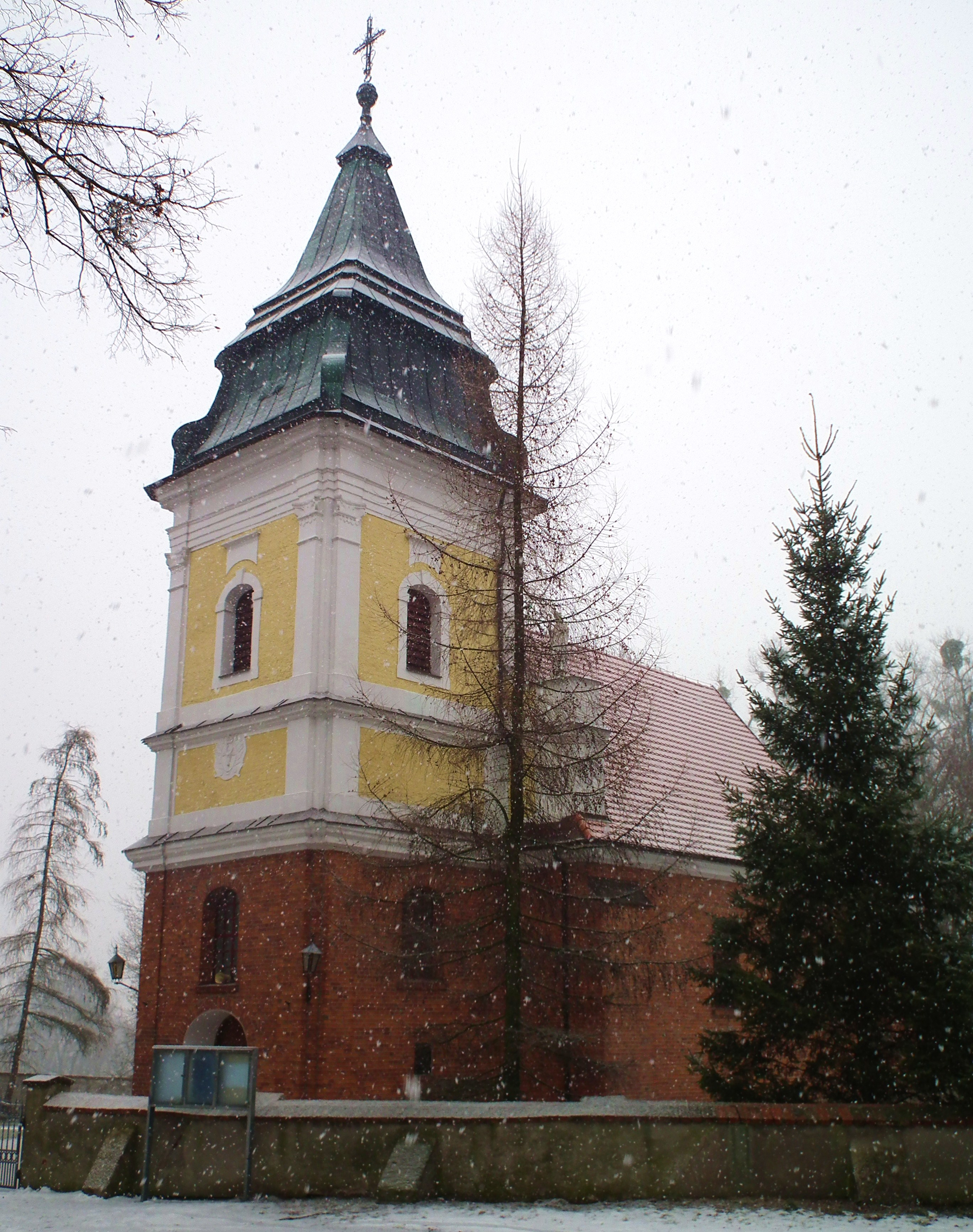
- Holy Cross church in Bieganowo

- Location within Poland
- Coordinates: 52°16′N 17°41′E
- Country: Poland
- Voivodeship: Greater Poland
- County: Września
- Gmina: Kołaczkowo
- Time zone: UTC+1 (CET)
  - Summer (DST): UTC+2 (CEST)

Bieganowo [bjɛɡaˈnɔvɔ] is a village in the administrative district of Gmina Kołaczkowo, within Września County, Greater Poland Voivodeship, in west-central Poland.

Bieganowo was a private village owned by various Polish nobles. Initially, until the 17th-18th century, it was the seat of the Bieganowski family of Grzymała coat of arms. Later it was also owned by the Bronisz and Grabski families.

The main landmarks of village are the Bieganowo Palace, built by Polish landowner, industrialist, philanthropist, and military officer Edward Grabski, and the Holy Cross church, dating back to the Middle Ages, and rebuilt in the 18th century.

== Gallery ==
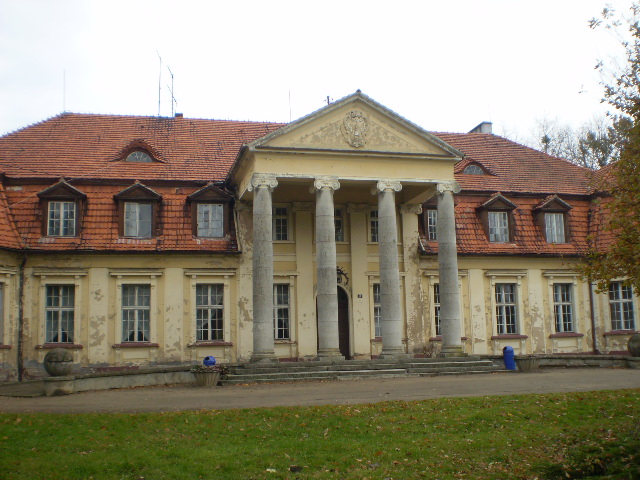
Grabski Palace

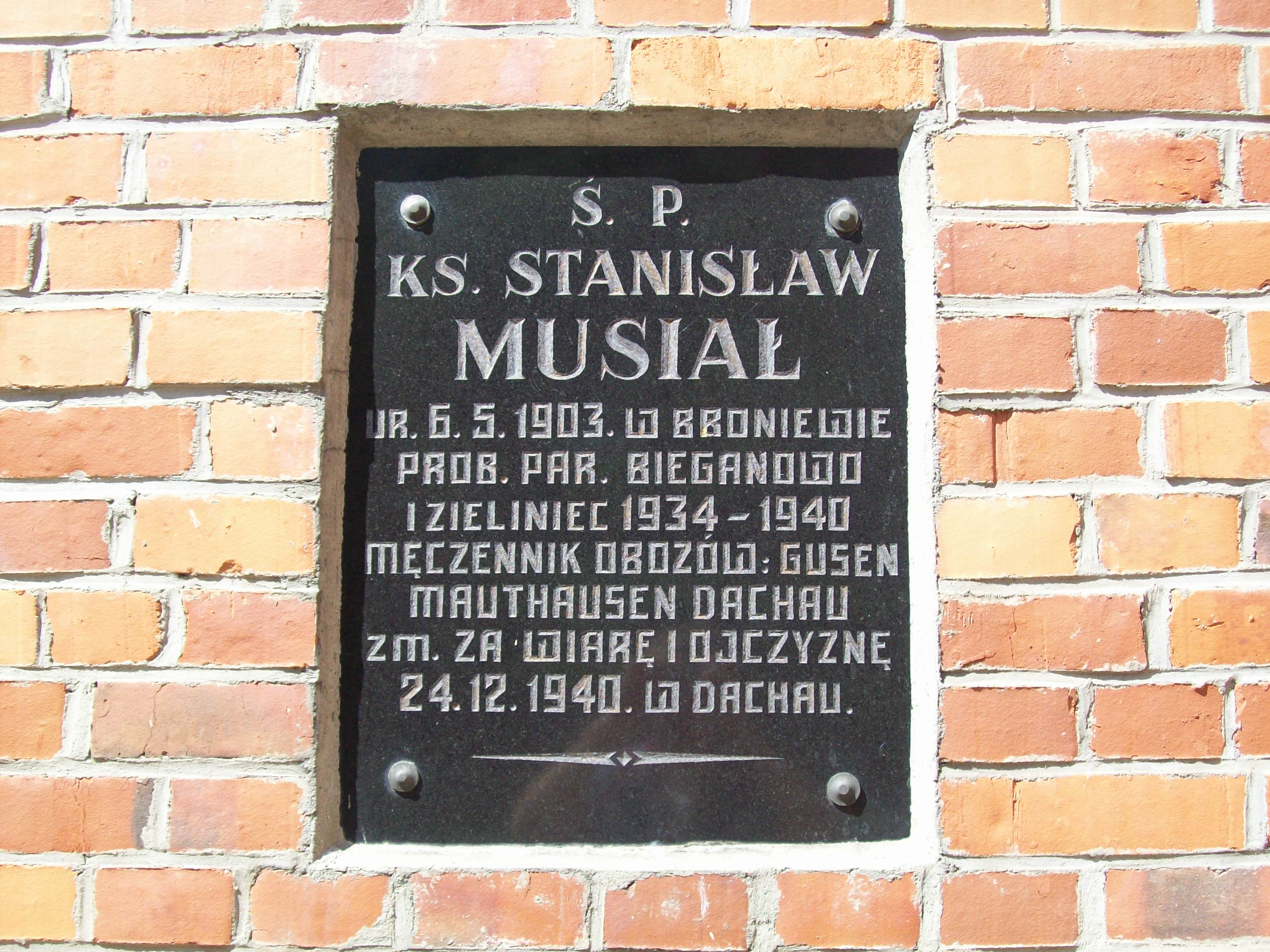
Memorial plaque to Stanisław Musiał, local parish priest killed by the Germans in the Dachau concentration camp in 1940
