= Żydowo, Września County =

Żydowo
- Village
- Location within Poland
- Coordinates: 52°13′53″N 17°39′12″E
- Country: Poland
- Voivodeship: Greater Poland
- County: Września
- Gmina: Kołaczkowo

Żydowo [ʐɨˈdɔvɔ] is a village in the administrative district of Gmina Kołaczkowo, within Września County, Greater Poland Voivodeship, in west-central Poland.
