= Cieśle Wielkie =

- Village
- Location within Poland
- Coordinates: 52°10′N 17°38′E
- Country: Poland
- Voivodeship: Greater Poland
- County: Września
- Gmina: Kołaczkowo

Cieśle Wielkie (German 1939–1945 Groß Ostfelde; [ˈt͡ɕɛɕlɛ ˈvjɛlkʲɛ] is a village in the administrative district of Gmina Kołaczkowo, Września County, Greater Poland Voivodeship, in west-central Poland.
