= Gałęzewice =

- Village
- Location within Poland
- Coordinates: 52°15′N 17°44′E
- Country: Poland
- Voivodeship: Greater Poland
- County: Września
- Gmina: Kołaczkowo

Gałęzewice [ɡawɛ̃zɛˈvit͡sɛ] is a village in the administrative district of Gmina Kołaczkowo, within Września County, Greater Poland Voivodeship, in west-central Poland.
