= Grabowo Królewskie =

- Village
- Location within Poland
- Coordinates: 52°14′28″N 17°37′16″E
- Country: Poland
- Voivodeship: Greater Poland
- County: Września
- Gmina: Kołaczkowo

Grabowo Królewskie [ɡraˈbɔvɔ kruˈlɛfskʲɛ] is a village in the administrative district of Gmina Kołaczkowo, within Września County, Greater Poland Voivodeship, in west-central Poland. Its German name was Grabowo or Grabenau 1940.

== Mansion in Grabowo Krolewskie ==
Royal Manor in Grabow
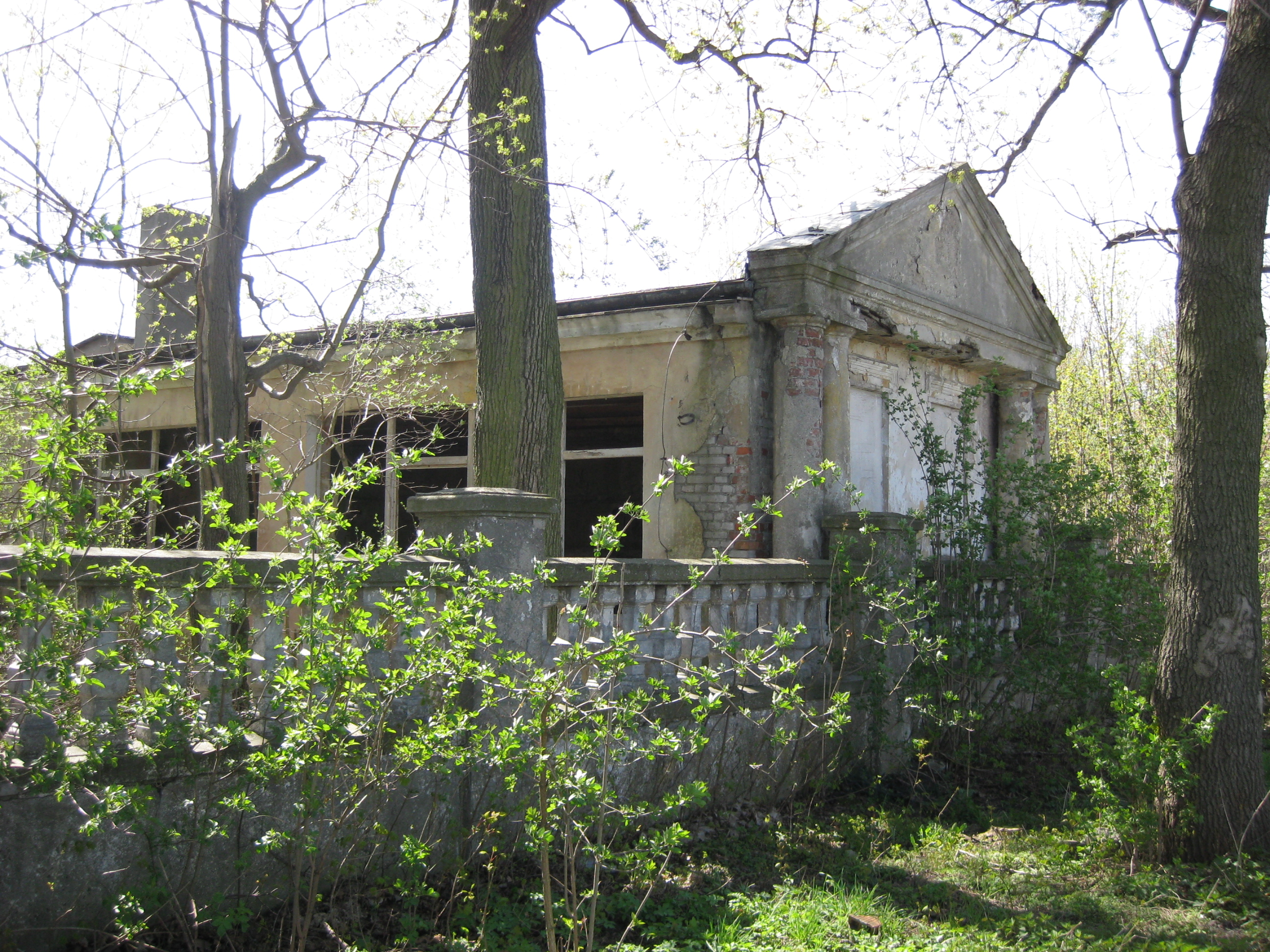
- Interactive map of the Royal Manor in Grabow area

General information
- Type: court
- Location: Grabowo Królewskie, Poland, Poland
- Owner: Gmina Września

Mansion in Grabowo Królewskie is the ruins of a building from the interwar period, located in Grabowo Królewskie, part of Greater Poland Voivodeship. The mansion in Grabowo Krolewskie was built in 1928. It was entered into the registry of monuments in 1998. The mansion belonged to the owner of the village, Witold Wilkoszewski (22 November 1881 – 17 April 1937). After World War II, it housed a lounge and a library. The manor house was surrounded by a garden. In his area, he placed concrete and plaster figurines of saints, farmers, and cupids. In 1928, the park was surrounded by a fence with gates.

== Gallery ==
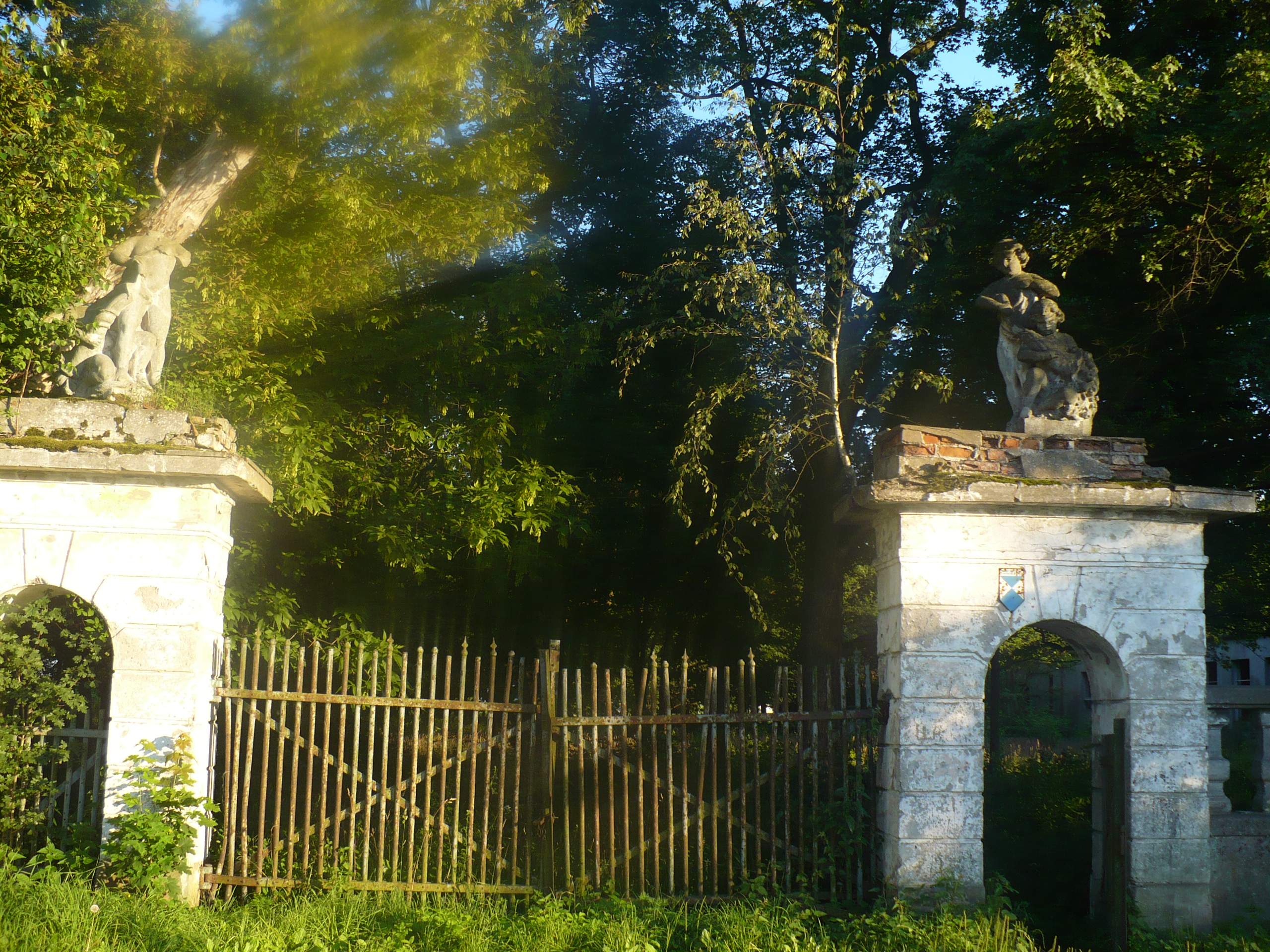
The gate to the park

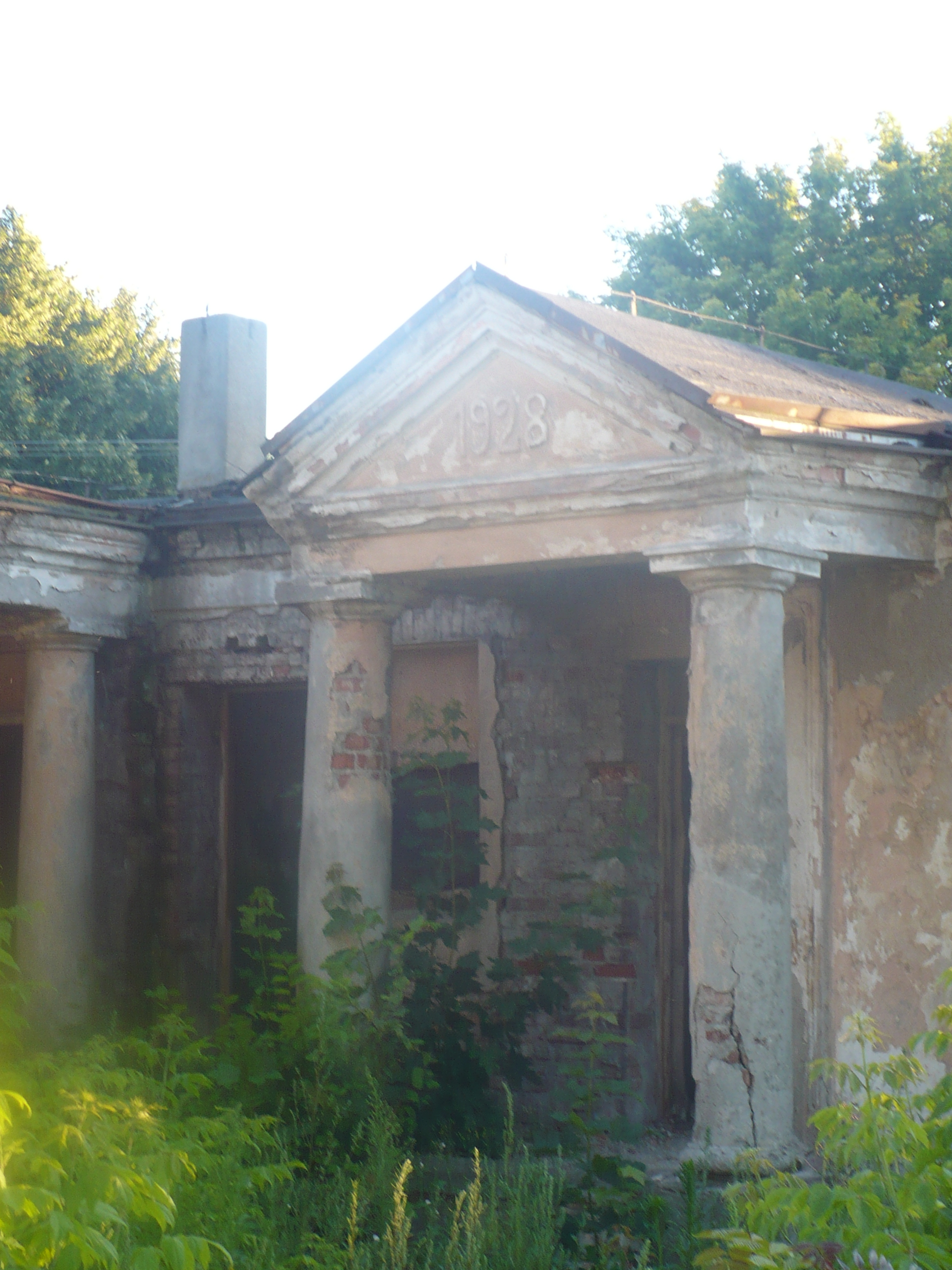
The ruins of the manor

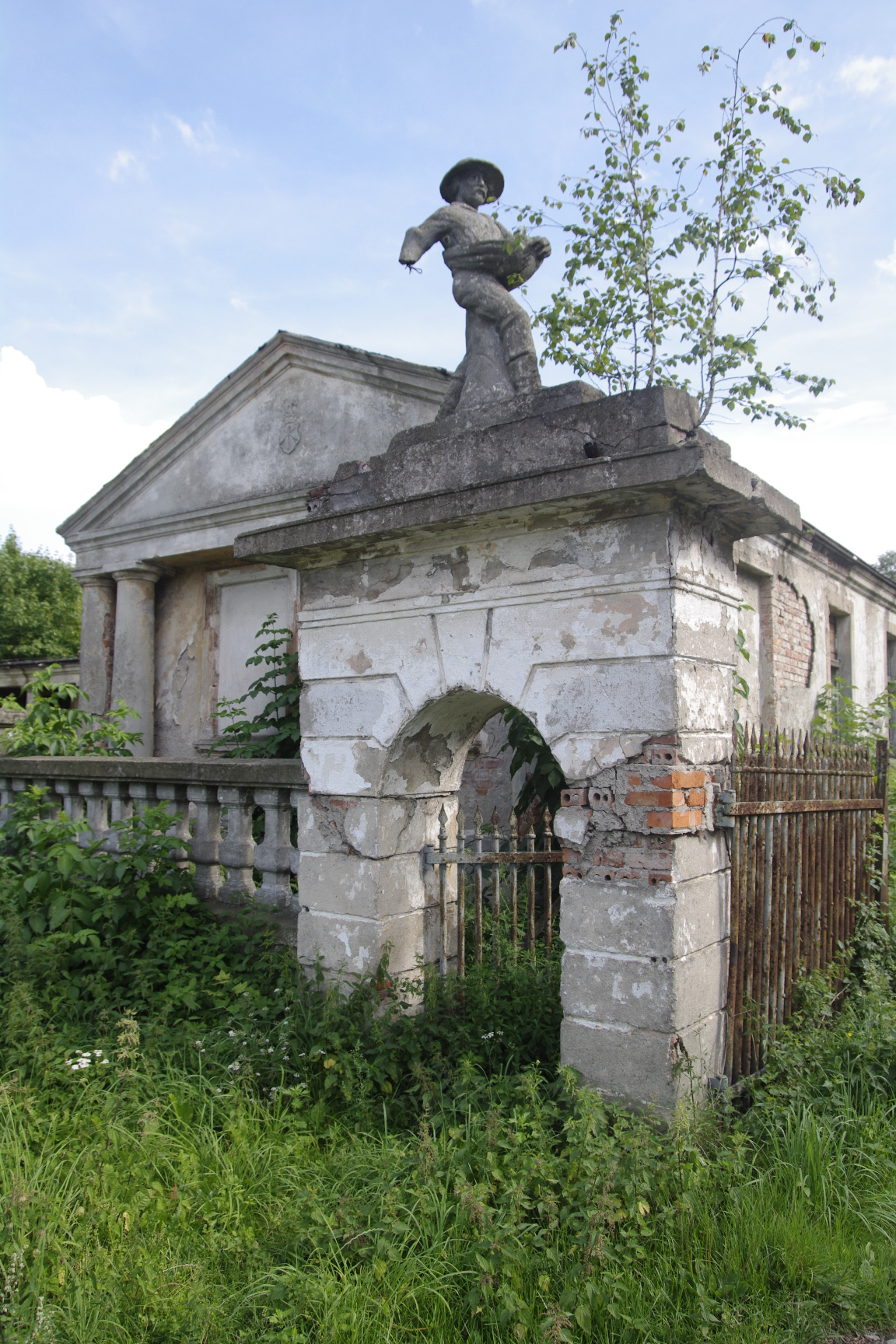
Front view of the palace

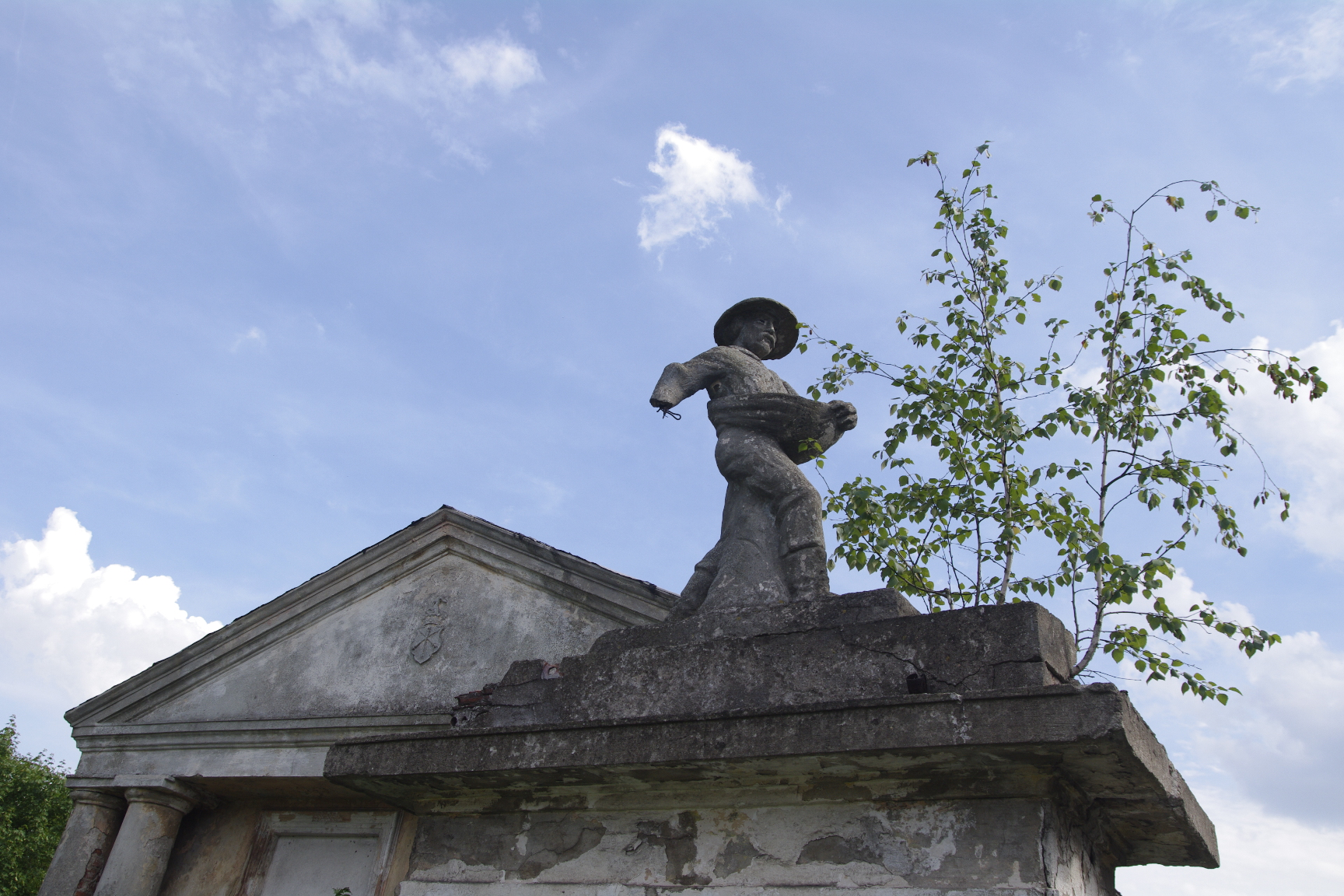
View of the figurine

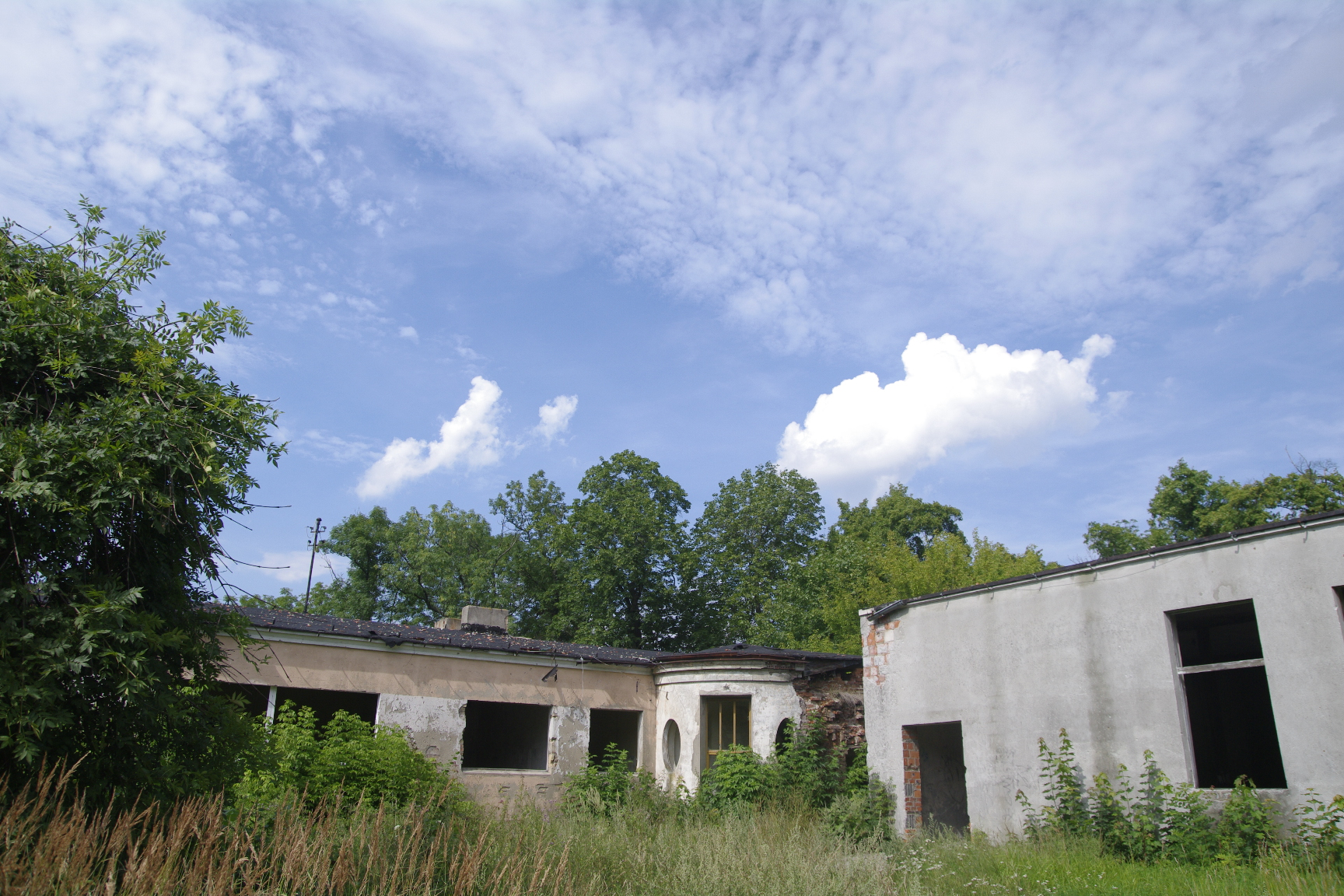
View of the palace from behind

== See also ==
- Church of the Sacred Heart of Jesus, Grabowo Królewskie
