= Bieganowo Palace =

- Pałac w Bieganowie
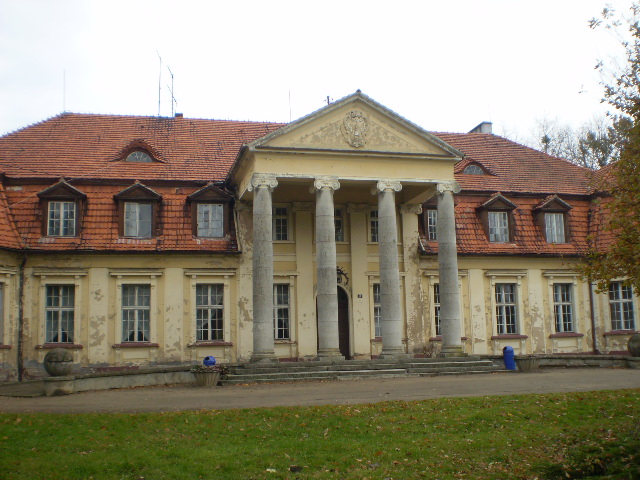
- Bieganowo Palace

- Location within Poland

General information
- Type: Palace
- Architectural style: eclecticism
- Location: Bieganowo, Poland
- Coordinates: 52°16′13″N 17°40′53″E
- Construction started: 1914
- Completed: 1916
- Client: Edward Grabski

Design and construction
- Architect: Stefan Cybichowski

Bieganowo Palace (Polish: Pałac w Bieganowie) - eclectic palace with elements of neoclassicism in Bieganowo (Września County, Poland), built between 1914 and 1916, designed by Stefan Cybichowski for Edward Grabski.

== Description ==
Building on a rectangular plan, with a mansard roof, with symmetrically placed alcoves. The axis of the entrance facade is decorated with pillared portico topped with a triangular pediment. On the garden side, there is a large terrace decorated with sculptures.

== History ==
Grzymalici Bieganowscy owned the palace until the seventeenth century. In 1880 it was owned by Stanisław Bronisz and in the twentieth century, it belonged to the Grabski family. In 1939 it was owned by Edward Grabski.

== Gallery ==
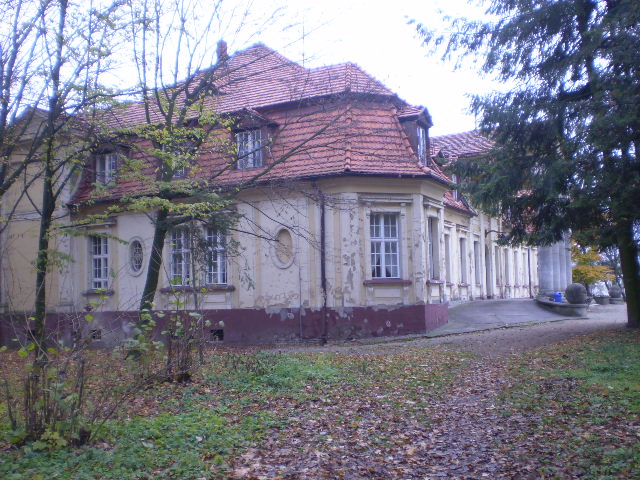
North face

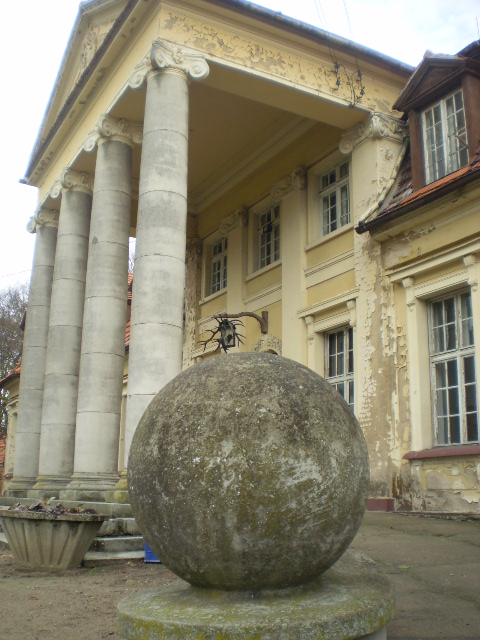
Facade

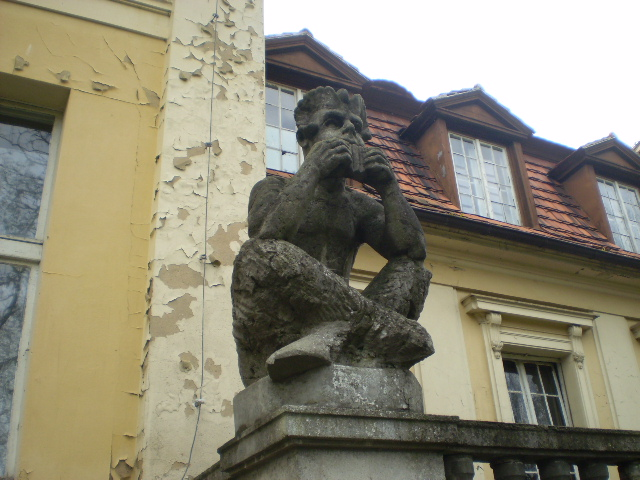
Sculpture

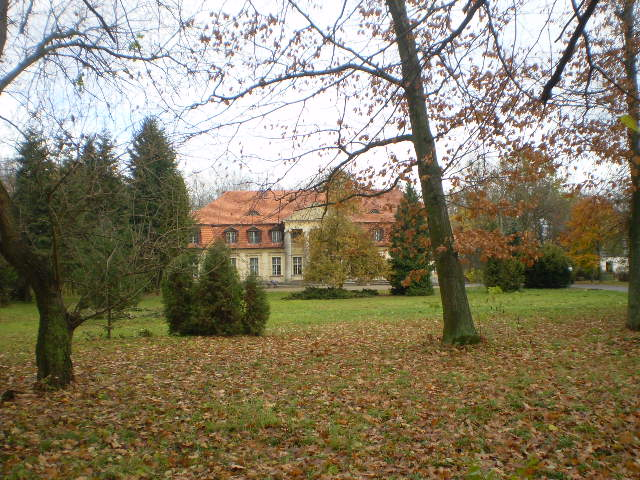
Front

Facade

== Sources ==
- Matelska, Klaudia; Matelski, Dariusz, Ziemia wrzesińska Gminy i miejscowości powiatu wrzesińskiego (in Polish), Warszawa: Kwadrat, ISBN 8391166317.
- Libicki, Marcin; Libicki, Piotr (2003), Dwory i pałace wiejskie w Wielkopolsce (in Polish), Poznań: Rebis, ISBN 83-01-03323-1.
