= Battle of Kampinos Forest =

Coordinates: 52°16′28″N 20°27′26″E

- Part of the Invasion of Poland
Date	9–20 September 1939
Location	Kampinos Forest, Warsaw Voivodeship, Poland
Result	German victory

Belligerents
(Nazi Germany) Germany	(Second Polish Republic) Poland

Commanders and leaders
(Nazi Germany) Gerd von Rundstedt	(Second Polish Republic) Tadeusz Kutrzeba (Second Polish Republic) Władysław Bortnowski (Second Polish Republic) Wiktor Thommée

Strength
8th Army (Wehrmacht); 10th Army (Wehrmacht)	Remnants of Poznań Army and Pomorze Army

The Battle of Kampinos Forest was in fact a series of skirmishes and battles fought in the forests around Kampinos during the Invasion of Poland of 1939, between the Polish Army and the German Wehrmacht.

By 16 September, the remnants of the Polish Wielkopolska Cavalry Brigade, the Podolska Cavalry Brigade, and the 15th and 25th Infantry Divisions, broke out of the Bzura Pocket into the Kampinos Forest. They were withdrawing through the large forest complex towards Warsaw and the Modlin Fortress.

The route was adopted by the Pomorze Army, under Gen. Władysław Bortnowski, the Poznań Army, under Gen. Tadeusz Kutrzeba. At the same time the German Wehrmacht tried to cut the Polish forces out by assaulting the forests both from the north and from the south.

== See also ==
- List of World War II military equipment of Poland
- List of German military equipment of World War II
