= Krzywa Góra, Greater Poland Voivodeship =

Krzywa Góra
- Village
- Location within Poland
- Coordinates: 52°14′2″N 17°34′54″E
- Country: Poland
- Voivodeship: Greater Poland
- County: Września
- Gmina: Kołaczkowo

Krzywa Góra [ˈkʂɨva ˈɡura] is a village in the administrative district of Gmina Kołaczkowo, within Września County, Greater Poland Voivodeship, in west-central Poland.
