= Gmina Kołaczkowo =

Gmina Kołaczkowo Kołaczkowo Commune
- Gmina
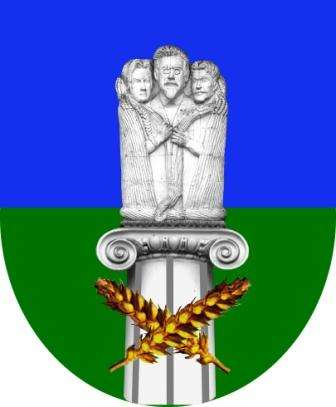
- Coat of arms
- Interactive map of Gmina Kołaczkowo
- Coordinates (Kołaczkowo): 52°13′N 17°37′E
- Country: Poland
- Voivodeship: Greater Poland
- County: Września
- Seat: Kołaczkowo

Area
  - Total: 115.95 km^{2} (44.77 sq mi)

Population (2006)
  - Total: 6,097
  - Density: 52.58/km^{2} (136.2/sq mi)
- Website: https://kolaczkowo.pl/

Gmina Kołaczkowo is a rural gmina (administrative district) in Września County, Greater Poland Voivodeship, in west-central Poland. Its seat is the village of Kołaczkowo, which lies approximately 14 kilometres (9 mi) south of Września and 52 km (32 mi) south-east of the regional capital Poznań.

The gmina covers an area of 115.95 square kilometres (44.8 sq mi), and as of 2006 its total population is 6,097.

== Villages ==
Gmina Kołaczkowo contains the villages and settlements of Bieganowo, Borzykowo, Budziłowo, Cieśle Małe, Cieśle Wielkie, Gałęzewice, Gorazdowo, Grabowo Królewskie, Kołaczkowo, Krzywa Góra, Łagiewki, Sokolniki, Spławie, Szamarzewo, Wszembórz, Zieliniec and Żydowo

== Neighbouring gminas ==
Gmina Kołaczkowo is bordered by the gminas of Lądek, Miłosław, Pyzdry, Strzałkowo, Września and Żerków.
