= Kołaczkowo, Września County =

Kołaczkowo
- Village
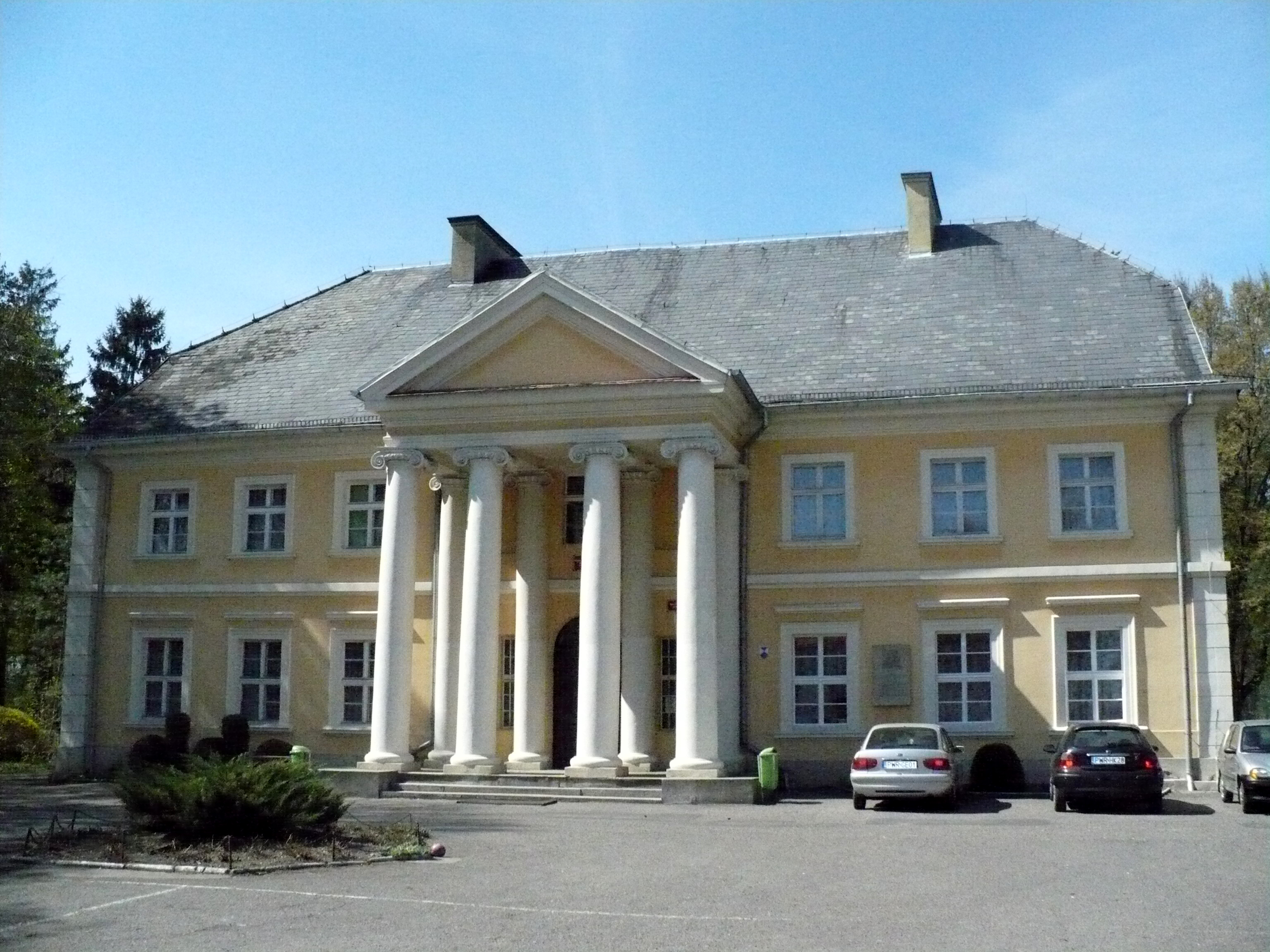
- Władysław Reymont Palace in Kołaczkowo

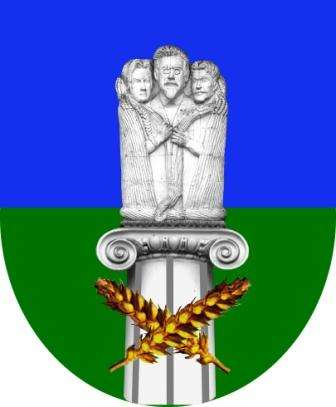
- Coat of arms

- Location within Poland
- Coordinates: 52°13′N 17°37′E
- Country: Poland
- Voivodeship: Greater Poland
- County: Września
- Gmina: Kołaczkowo
- Time zone: UTC+1 (CET)
  - Summer (DST): UTC+2 (CEST)

Kołaczkowo [kɔwat͡ʂˈkɔvɔ] is a village in Września County, Greater Poland Voivodeship, in west-central Poland. It is the seat of the gmina (administrative district) called Gmina Kołaczkowo.

The main landmark of the village is the Reymont Palace, in which Polish novelist and Nobel Prize laureate Władysław Reymont lived from 1920 to 1925. It currently houses a museum dedicated to Reymont. Another notable historic structure is the Saint Simon and Jude Thaddeus church.

== Transport ==
Kołaczkowo lies voivodeship road 442.

The nearest railway station is in Września.
