= Września Courthouse =

Public building in st. Jana Pawła II, Poland

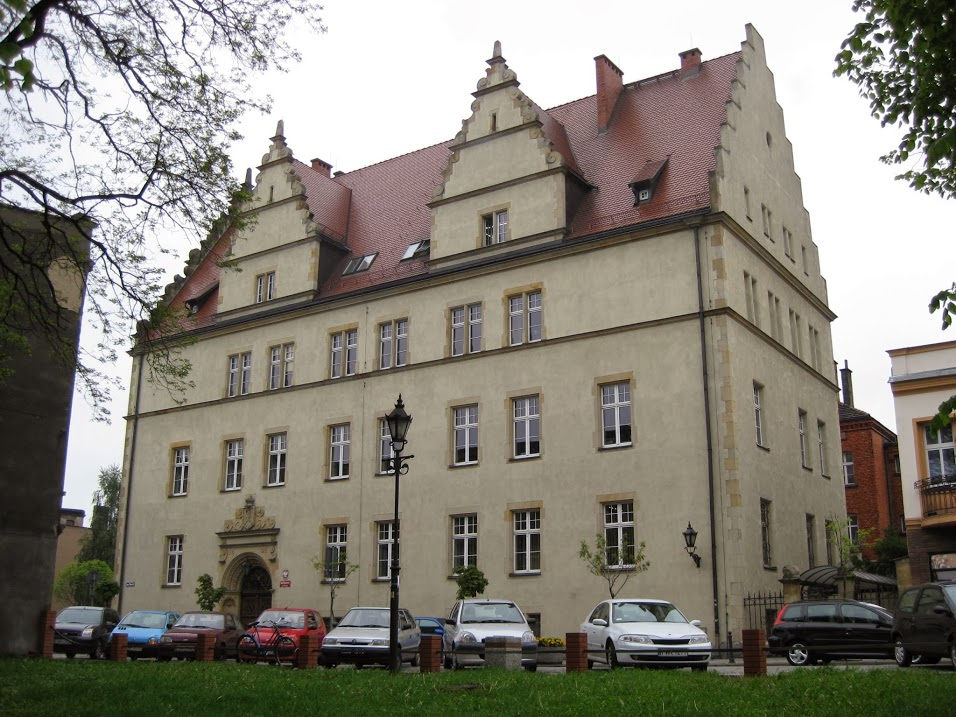

- Location within Poland

General information
- Type: Public building
- Architectural style: renaissance public building
- Location: Września, st. Jana Pawła II 10, Poland
- Coordinates: 52°19′37.03″N 17°33′53.31″E
- Completed: 1906

Technical details
- Floor count: 3

Września Courthouse is a three-storey building in Gdańsk renaissance style built in 1906.

== Gallery ==
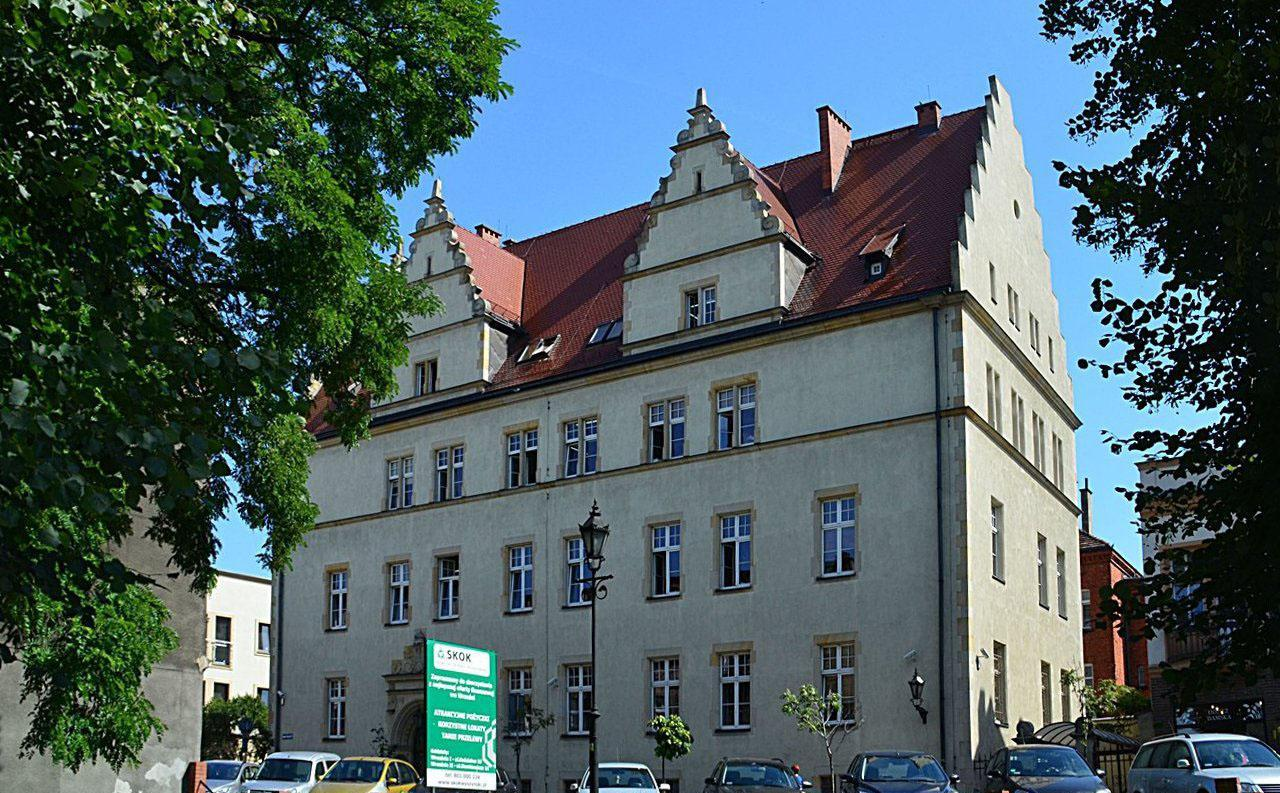

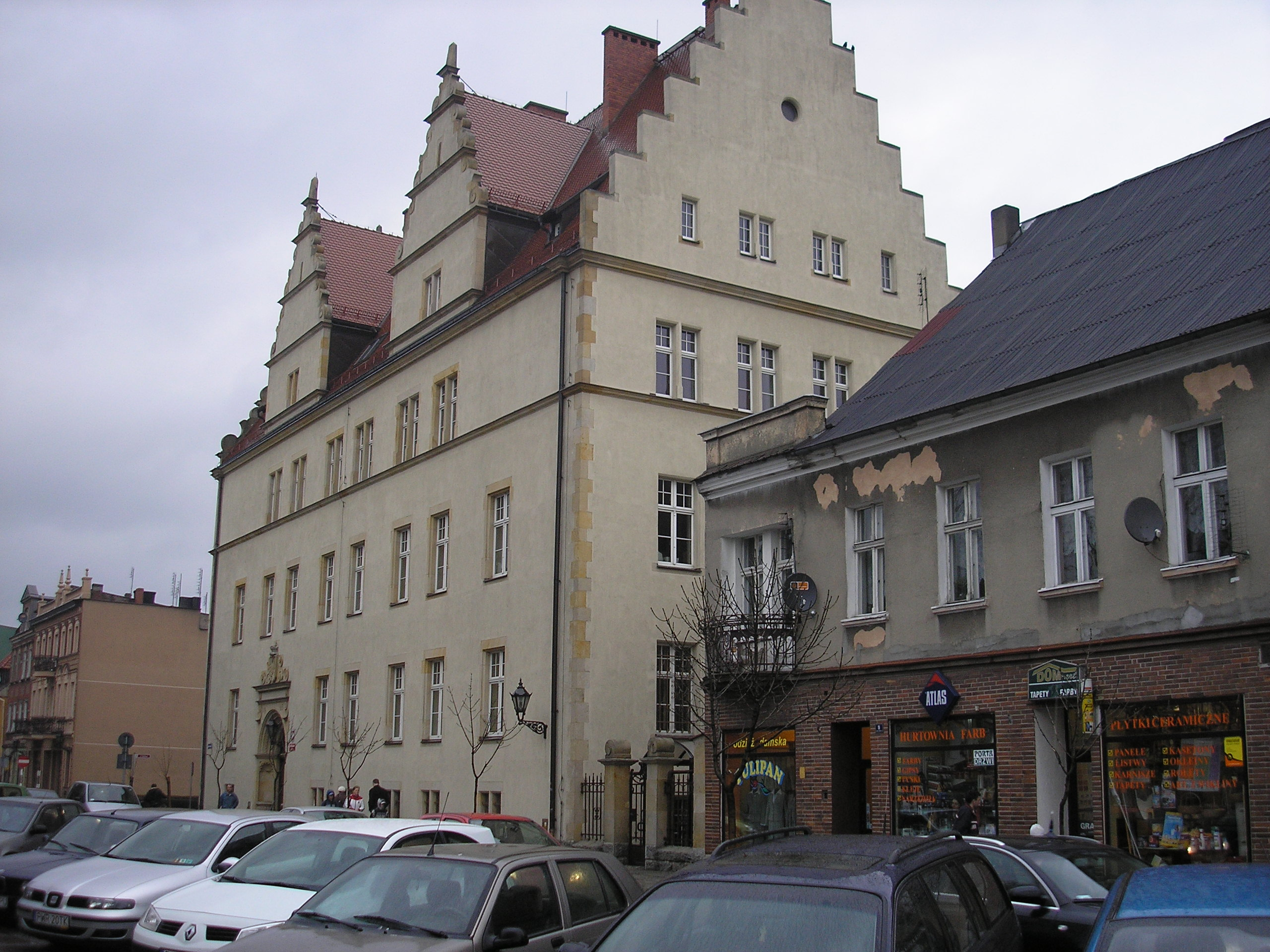

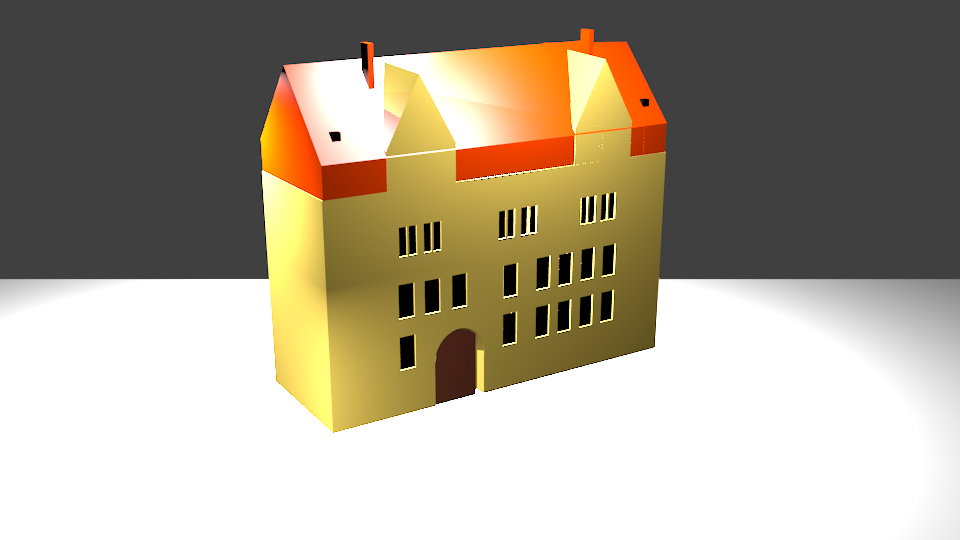

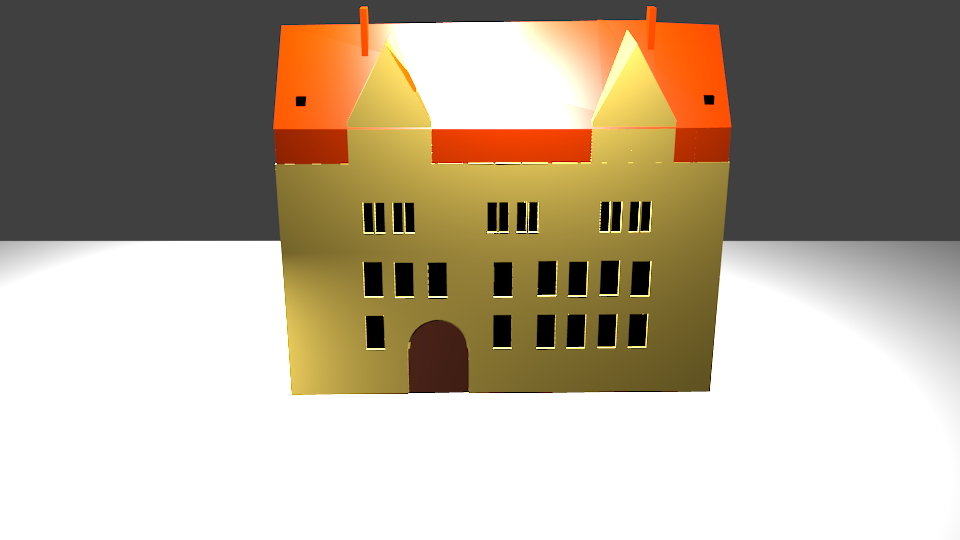
