= Holy Cross Church, Września =

Church in Września, Poland

Coordinates: 52°20′01″N 17°33′04″E

Holy Cross Church, Września (in Polish) Kościół Świętego Krzyża we Wrześni
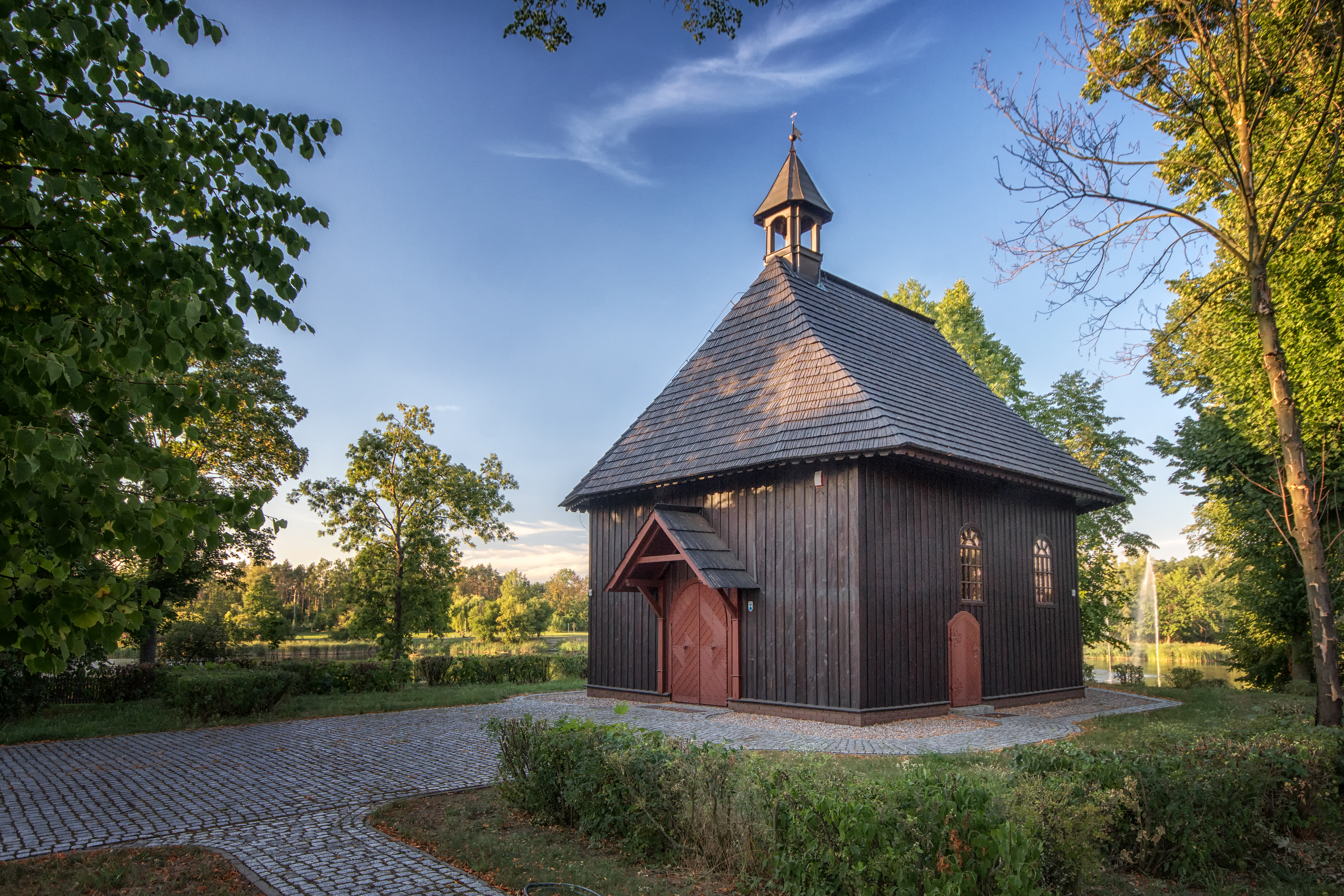

Religion
- Affiliation: Roman Catholic
- Diocese: Września
- Province: Archdiocese of Gniezno

Location
- Location: Września
- Interactive map of Holy Cross Church, Września (in Polish) Kościół Świętego Krzyża we Wrześni

Architecture
- Completed: 17th century

Specifications
- Direction of façade: south east
- Spire: 1
- Materials: wood

Holy Cross Church, Września (pl. Kościół Świętego Krzyża we Wrześni) - is a wooden church (to 1966 likes chapel) in the north-western part of Września, Poland, located in the Lipówka district, on Świętokrzyska street, next to the storage reservoir Wrześnica. The church is registered as a protected monument Greater Poland Voivodeship - No. 2293/A (December 8, 1993).

== History and building description ==
Funded by Września's rectors in the 17th century, the Holy Cross Church was the first chapel to be built in the Lipówka district. The church's founding is pertinently connected to a nearby spring and is regarded as miraculous.

== Images ==
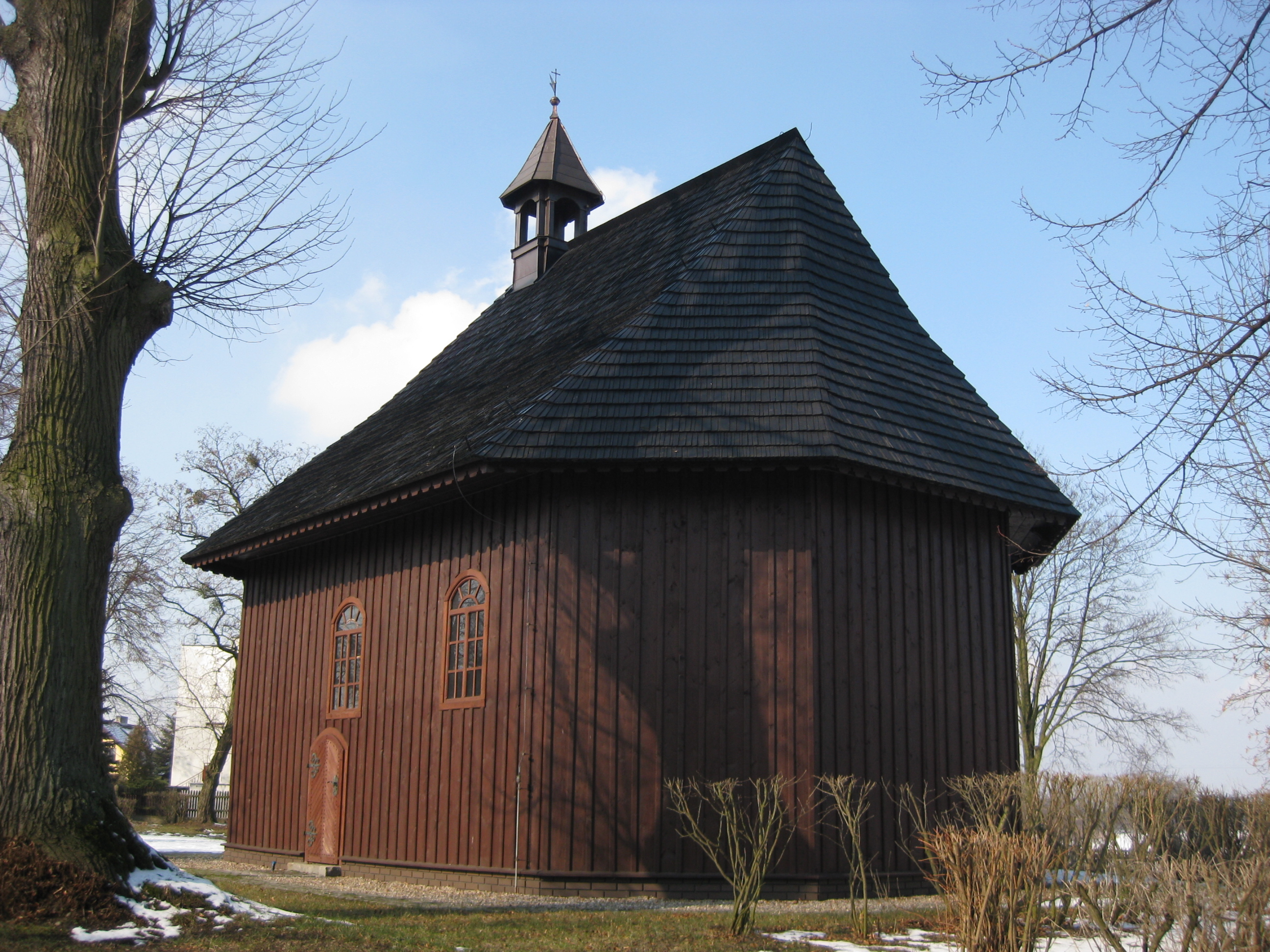
View from the east side

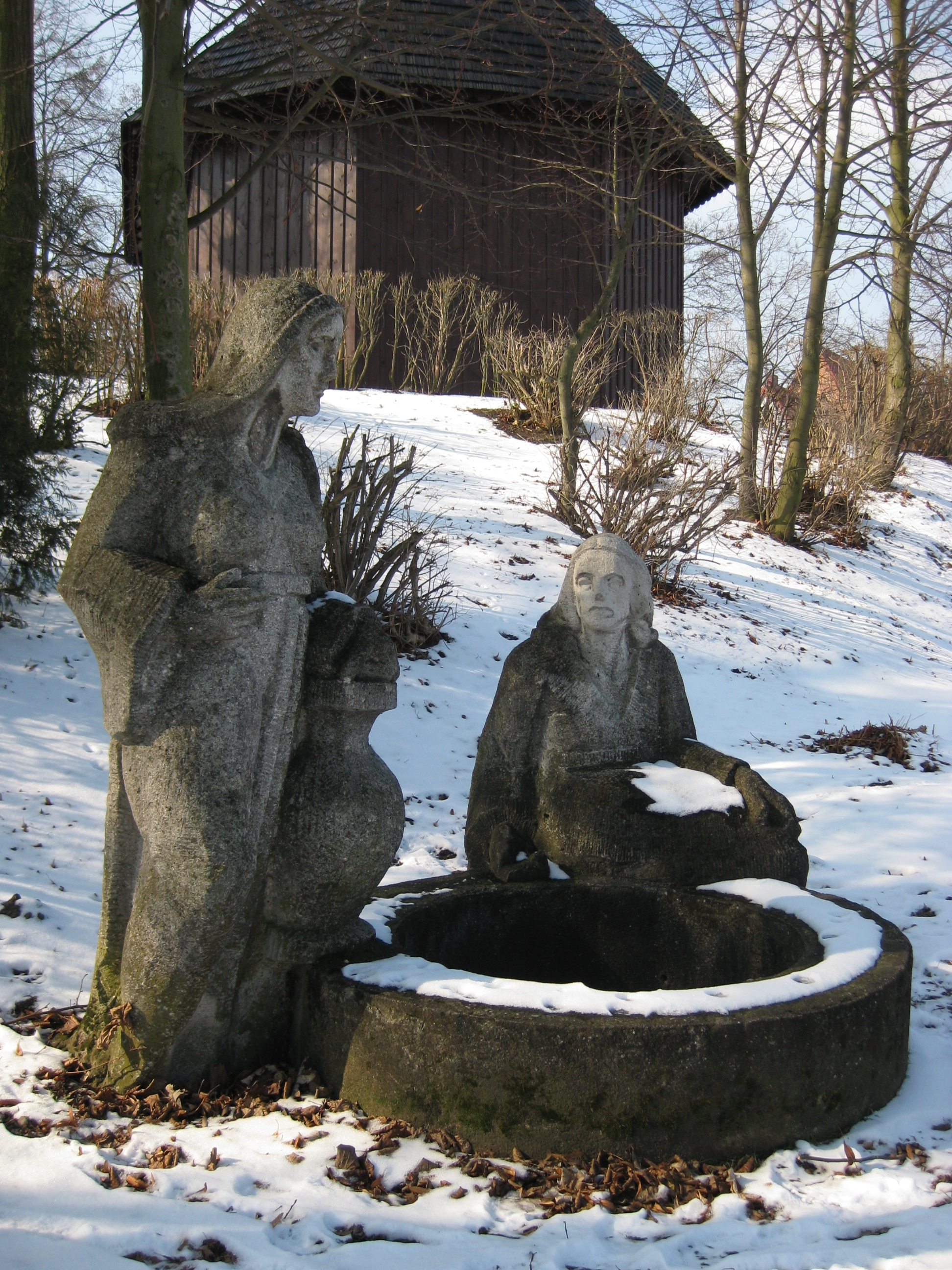
Spring near the Saint Cross church

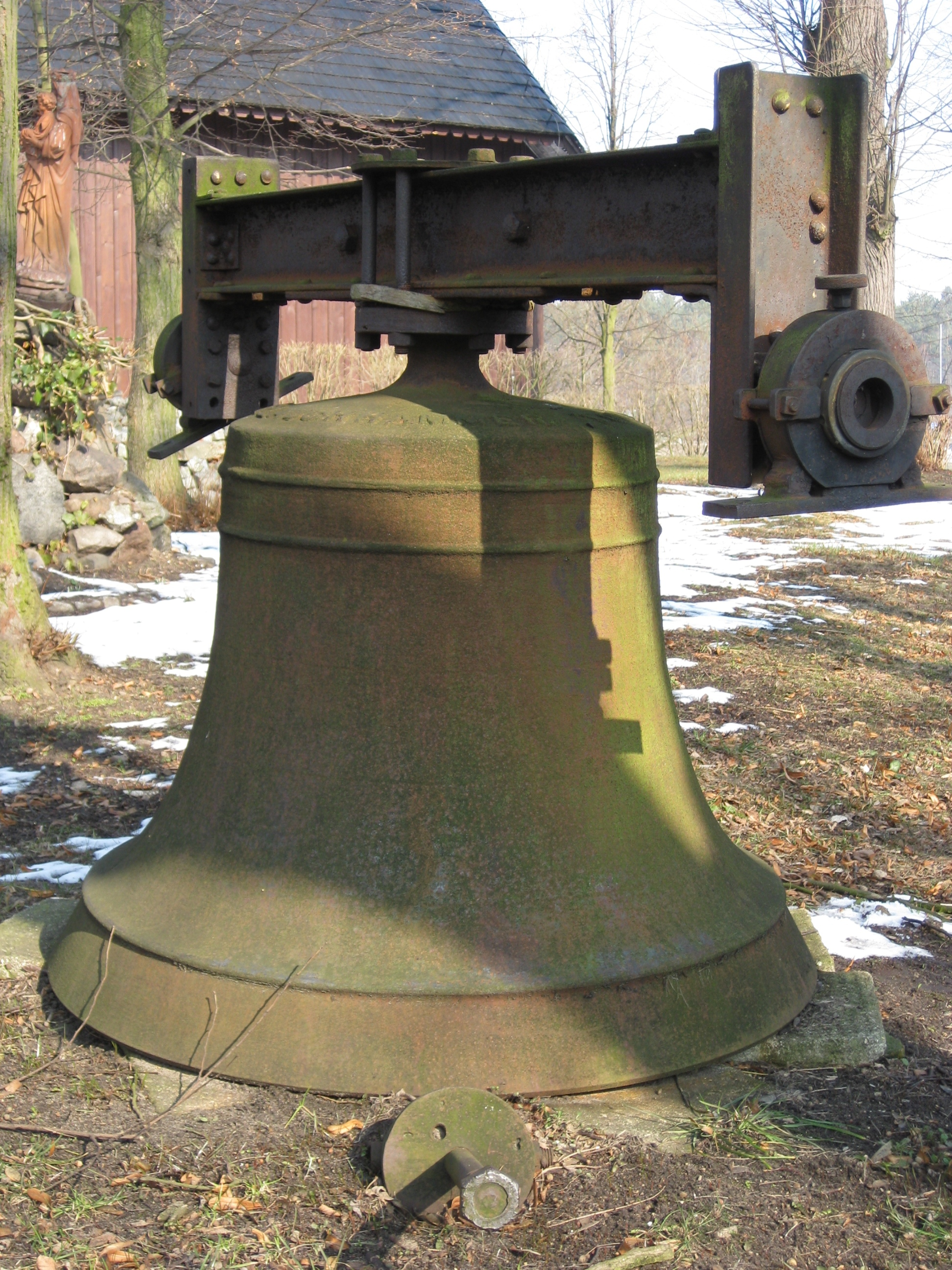
Bell near the Saint Cross church

== Notes and references ==
- (in Polish) Krzysztof Jodłowski: Zabytki Wrześni. [w:] Marian Torzewski (red.): Września. Historia miasta. Muzeum Regionalne im. Dzieci Wrzesińskich we Wrześni, Września, 2006, ISBN 978-83-924220-0-6, s. 430-431
