= Barracks Complex in Września =

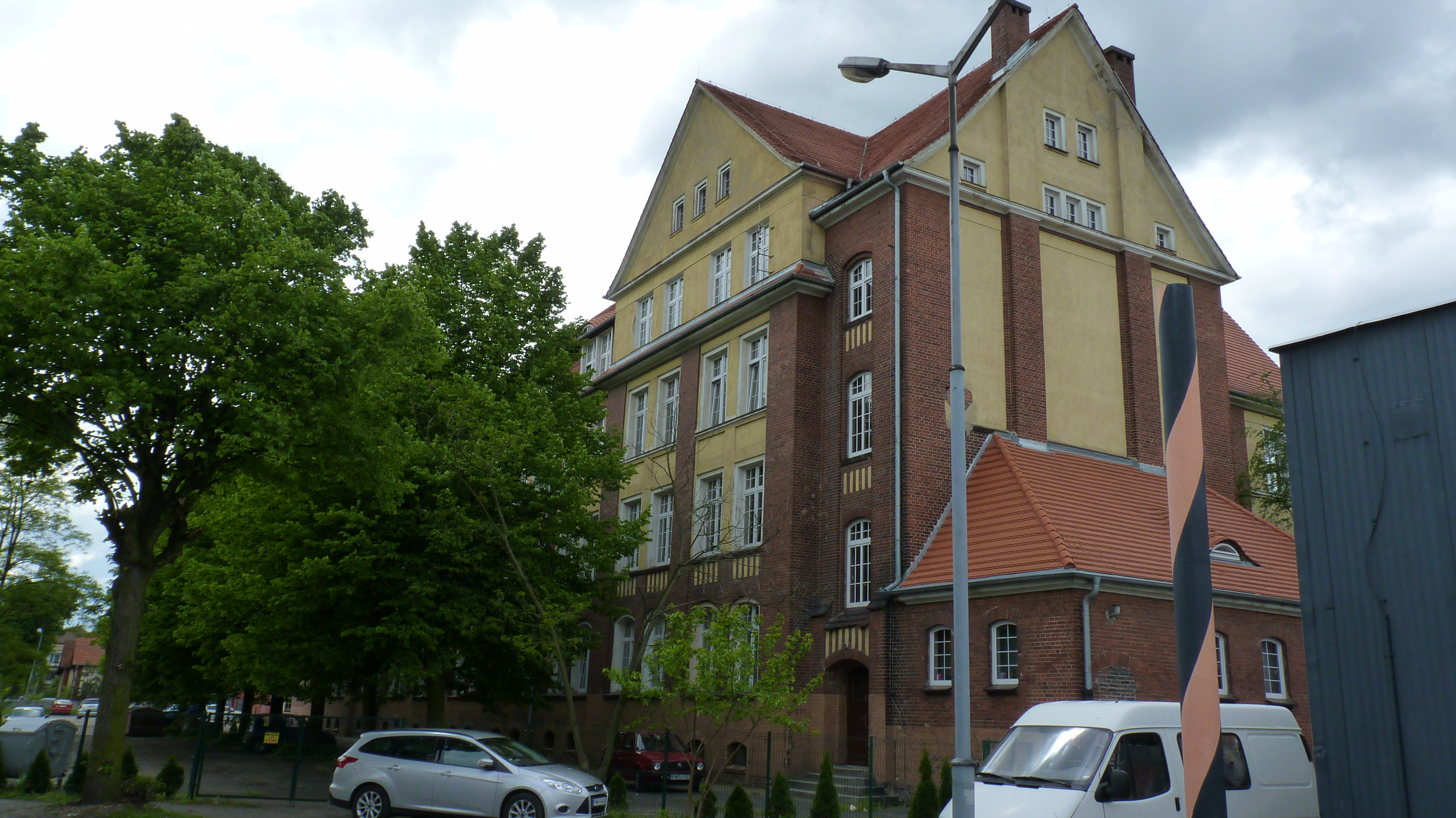
- The Barracks Complex in Września

- Location within Poland

General information
- Type: Barracks
- Location: Września, Poland, ul. Kościuszki, 62-300 Września
- Coordinates: 52°19′15″N 17°34′45″E
- Construction started: 1902
- Completed: 1910

The Barracks Complex in Września - the old Prussian barracks, built in the early twentieth century (1902–1910), at the current Kosciuszko Street (old de. Kaiser-Wilhelm-strasse).

== Description ==
At the Koszarowa Street and Kosciuszko Street in Wrzesnia is prussian Barracks Complex, built in 1902–1910. In the Barracks Complex is located historic coach house, which is entered in the register of monuments.

== History ==
In 1902, on south-eastern site of Września started building of the barracks. At the beginning was building on Kosciuszko Street, and later the buildings in depths of the property, which replaced the previous buildings. Construction lasted until 1910. Land occupied areas of about 12 hectares, its shape was similar to a square. The property fenced fence of metal bars embedded between the posts of brick.

=== Coach House ===
The barracks is located historic coach house, entered in the register of monuments in 1996.

=== Management ===
In the interwar period was stationed in the barracks 68th Infantry Regiment of the Polish Army ( 1921 ) . After World War II, stationed in the barracks first Polish Army, later, up to 1992, the Soviet Army was stationed . During this time, a number of repair and modernization work, which changed significantly the appearance of the barracks, many objects have lost their functions or ceased to exist, created many new ones. From the area of the barracks was turned off south-west part of the team of five officers' homes, South is one of the blocks and warehouse uniformed soldiers . When work began in 1992, with a view to adopting the premises to the new features . The soldier's unit is currently Vocational School, in the hall of exercise is a sports and recreation complex "Świat Wodny Cenos". Other buildings earmarked for residential purposes . The Inner Road barracks complex is now called Koszarowa Street .

== Gallery ==
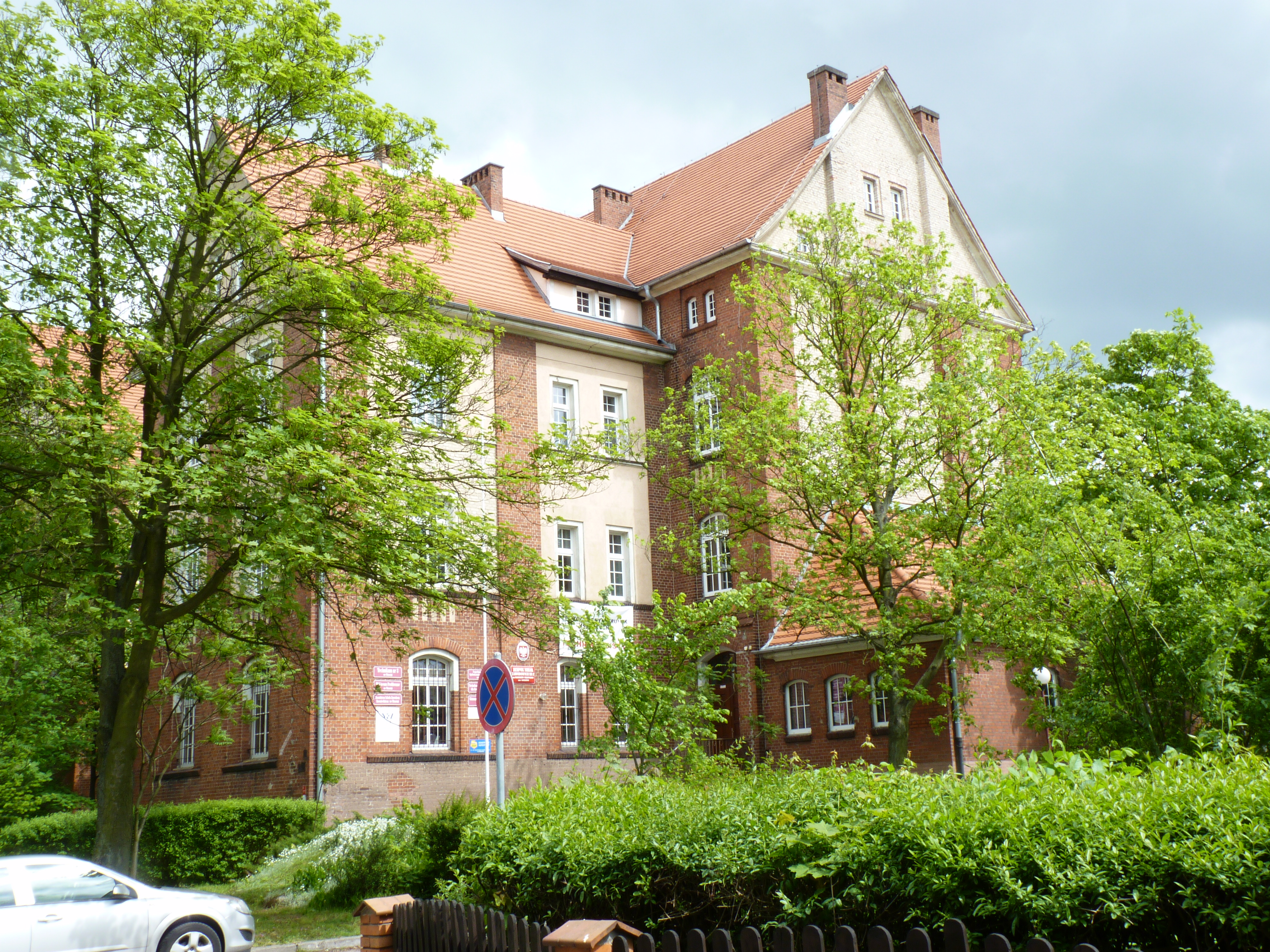
Old barracks building

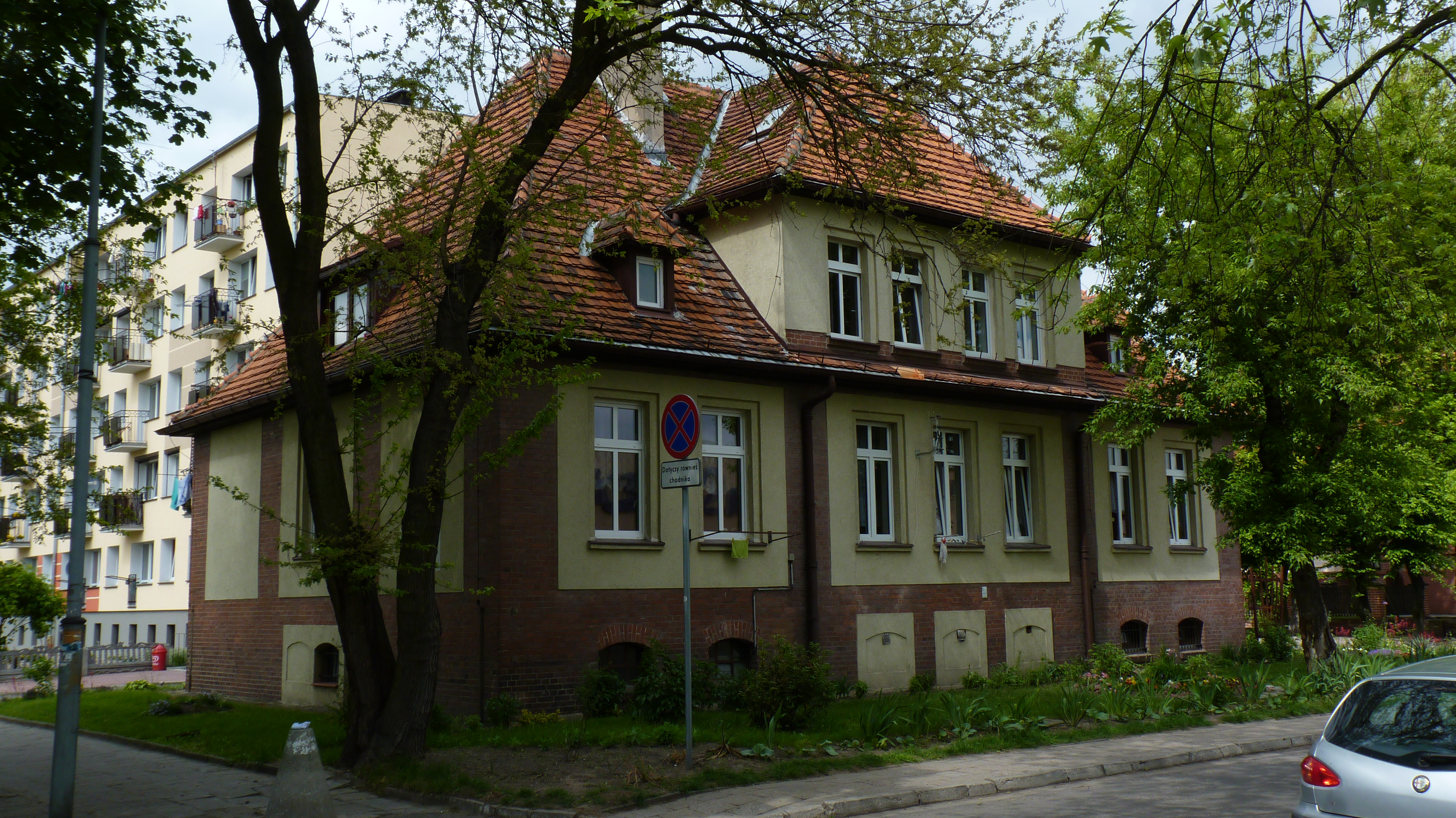
Old barracks building

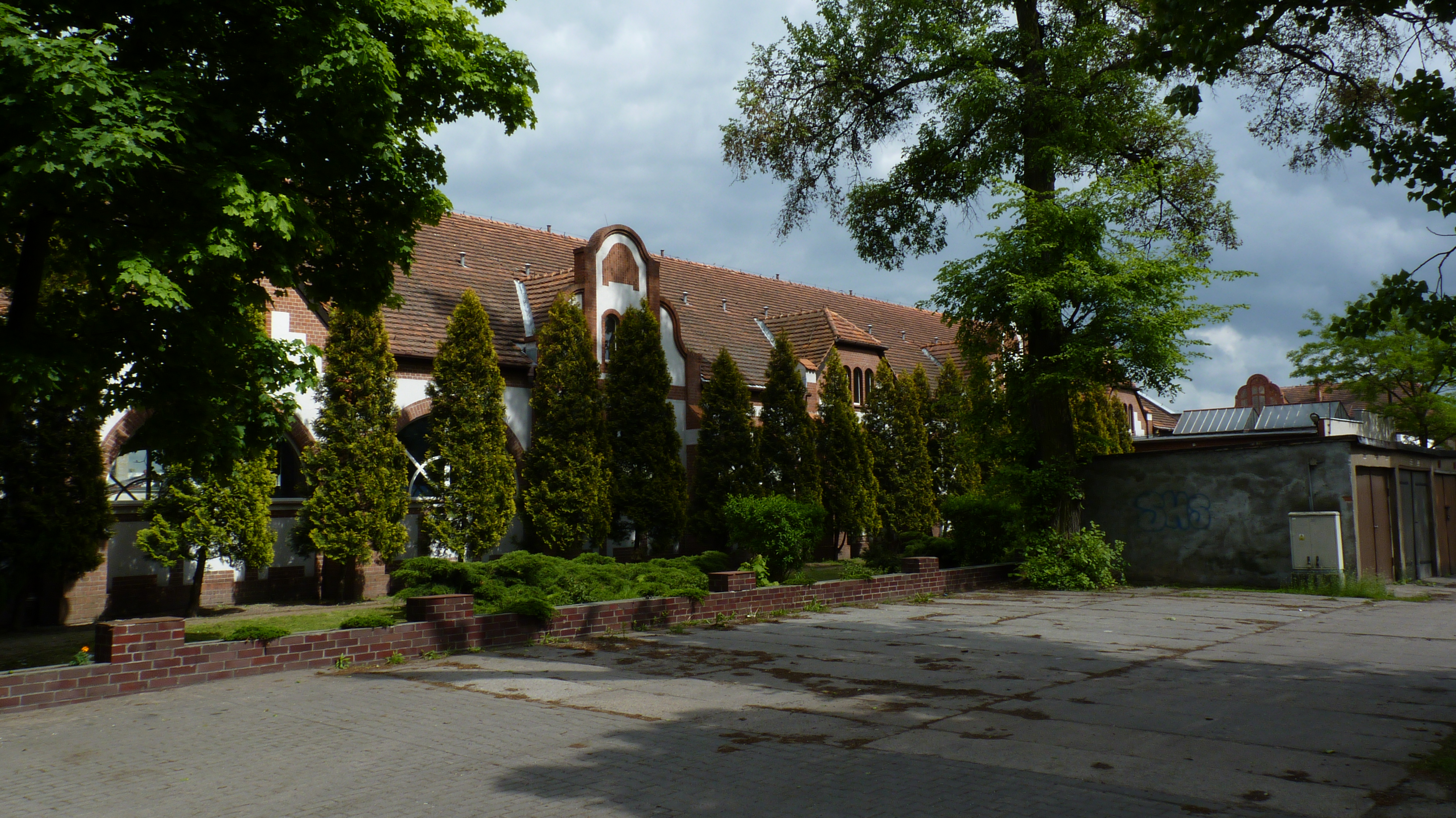
Old barracks building

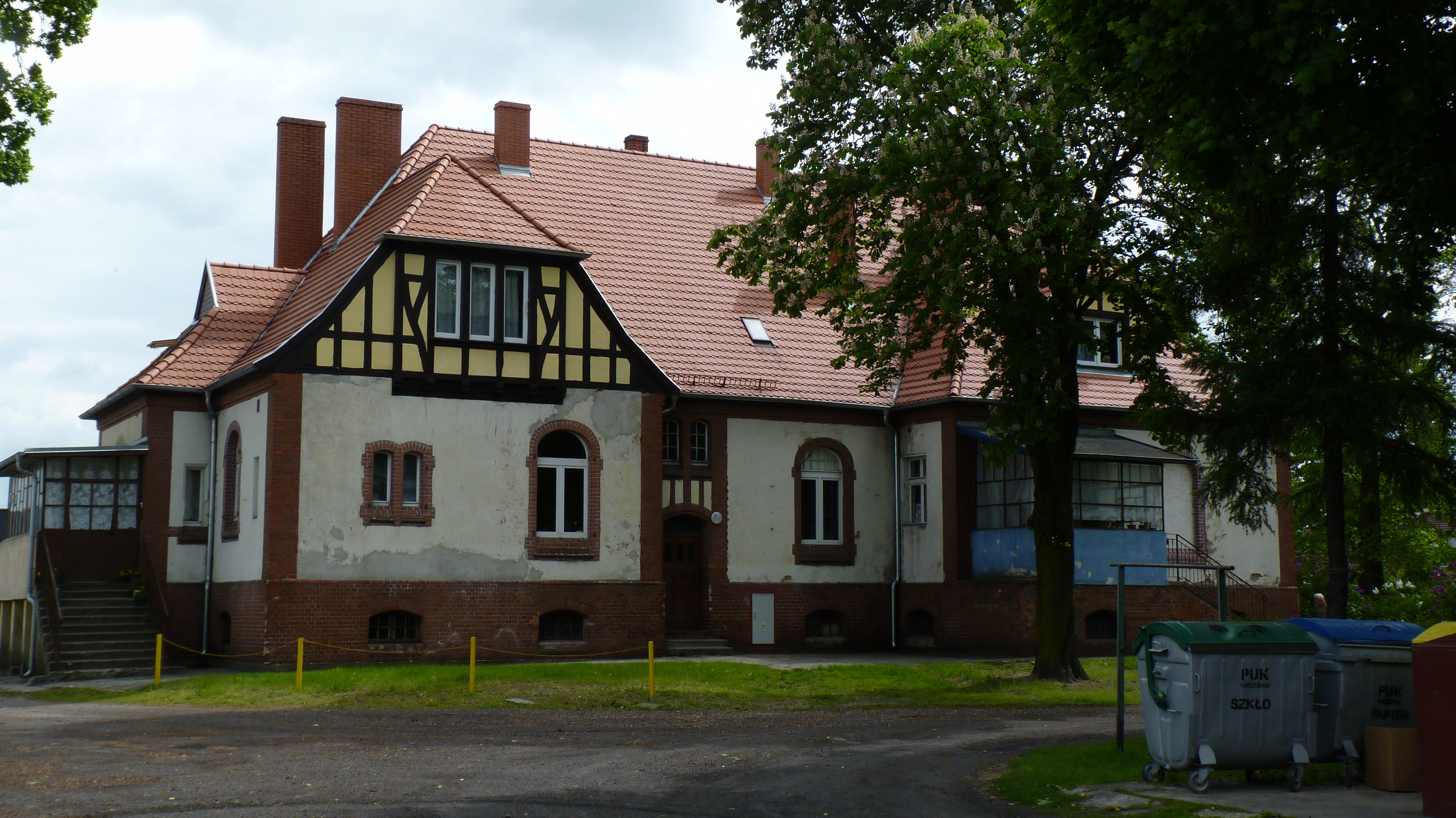
Old barracks building

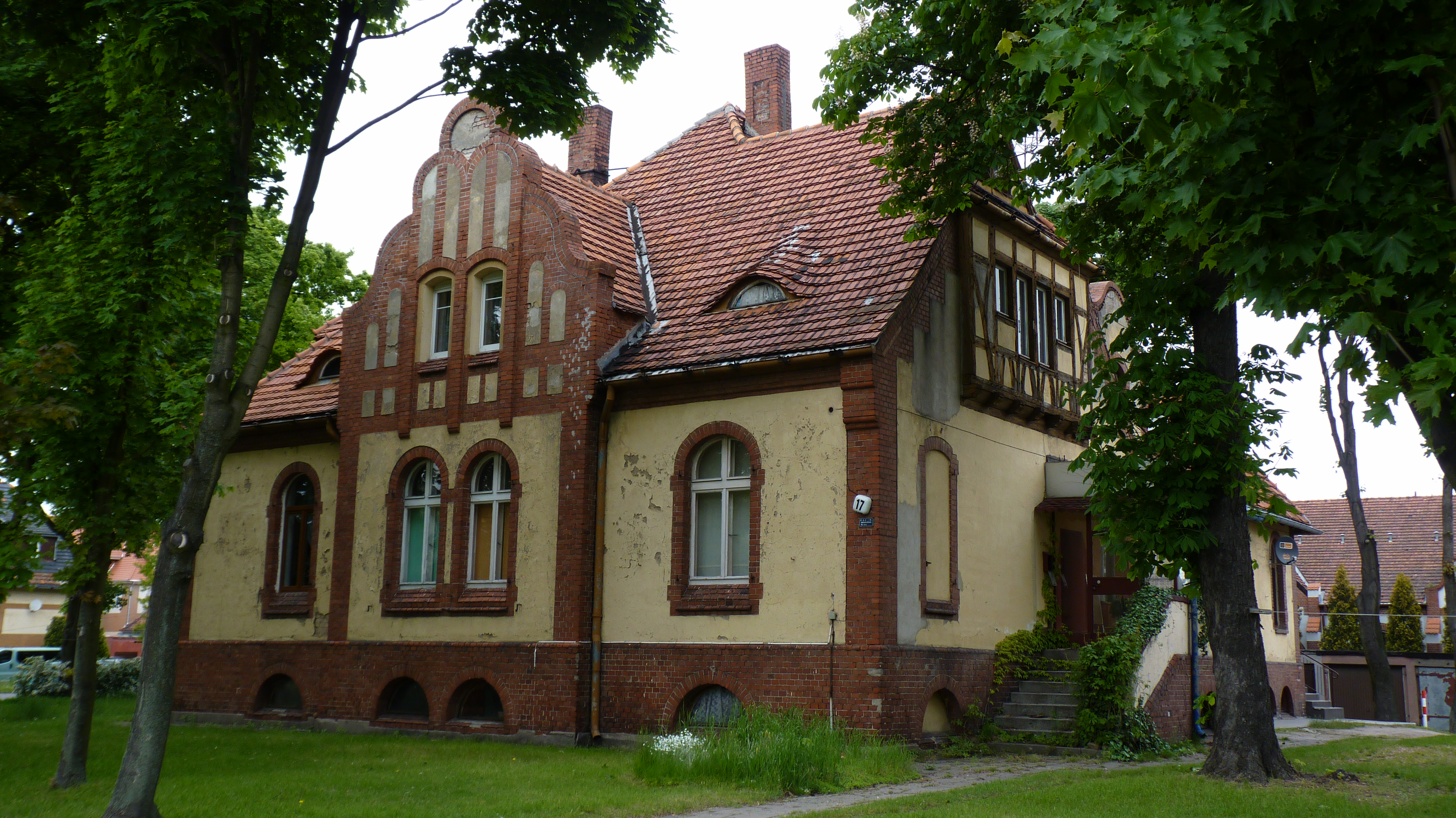
Old barracks building

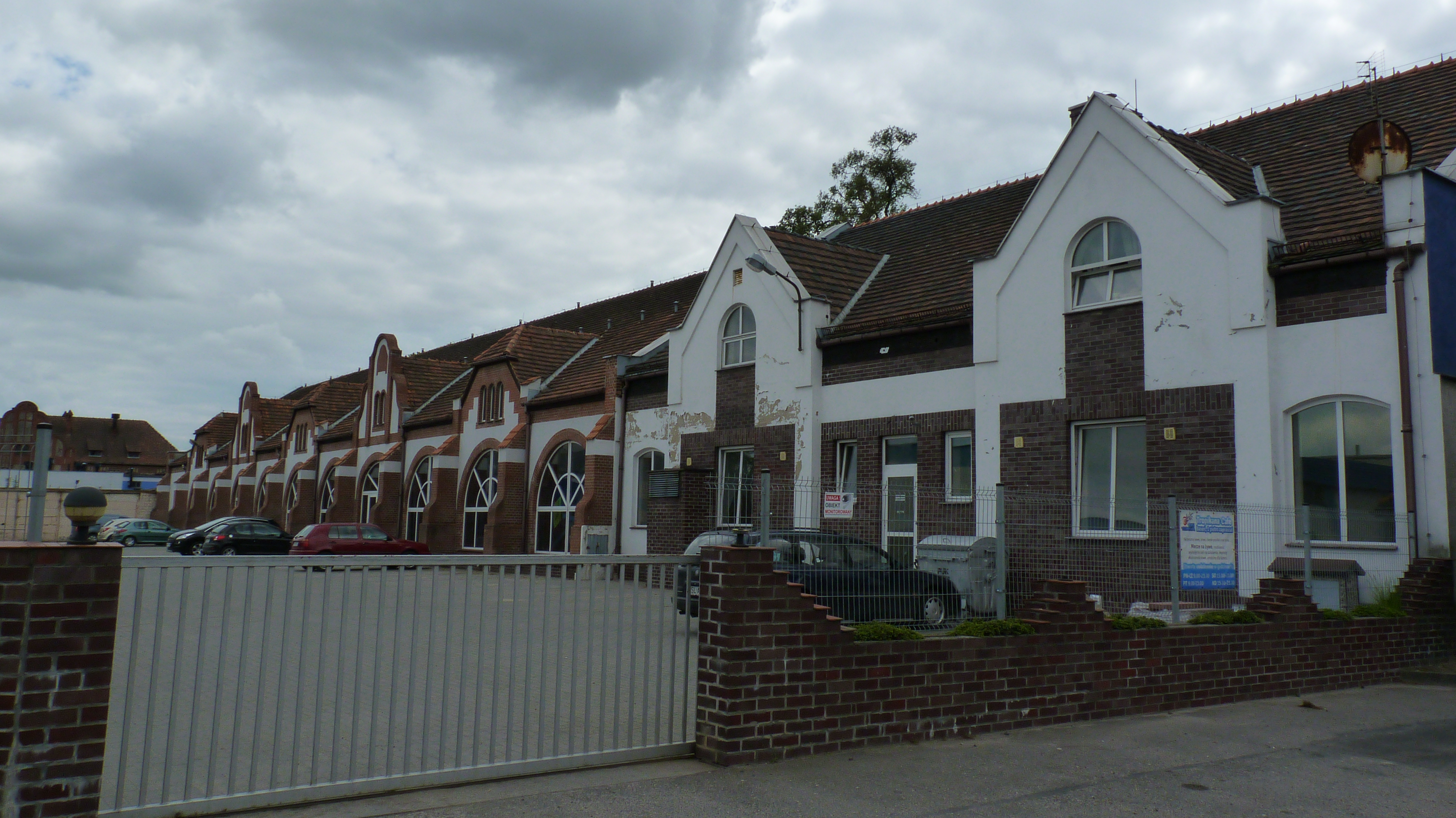
Old barracks building

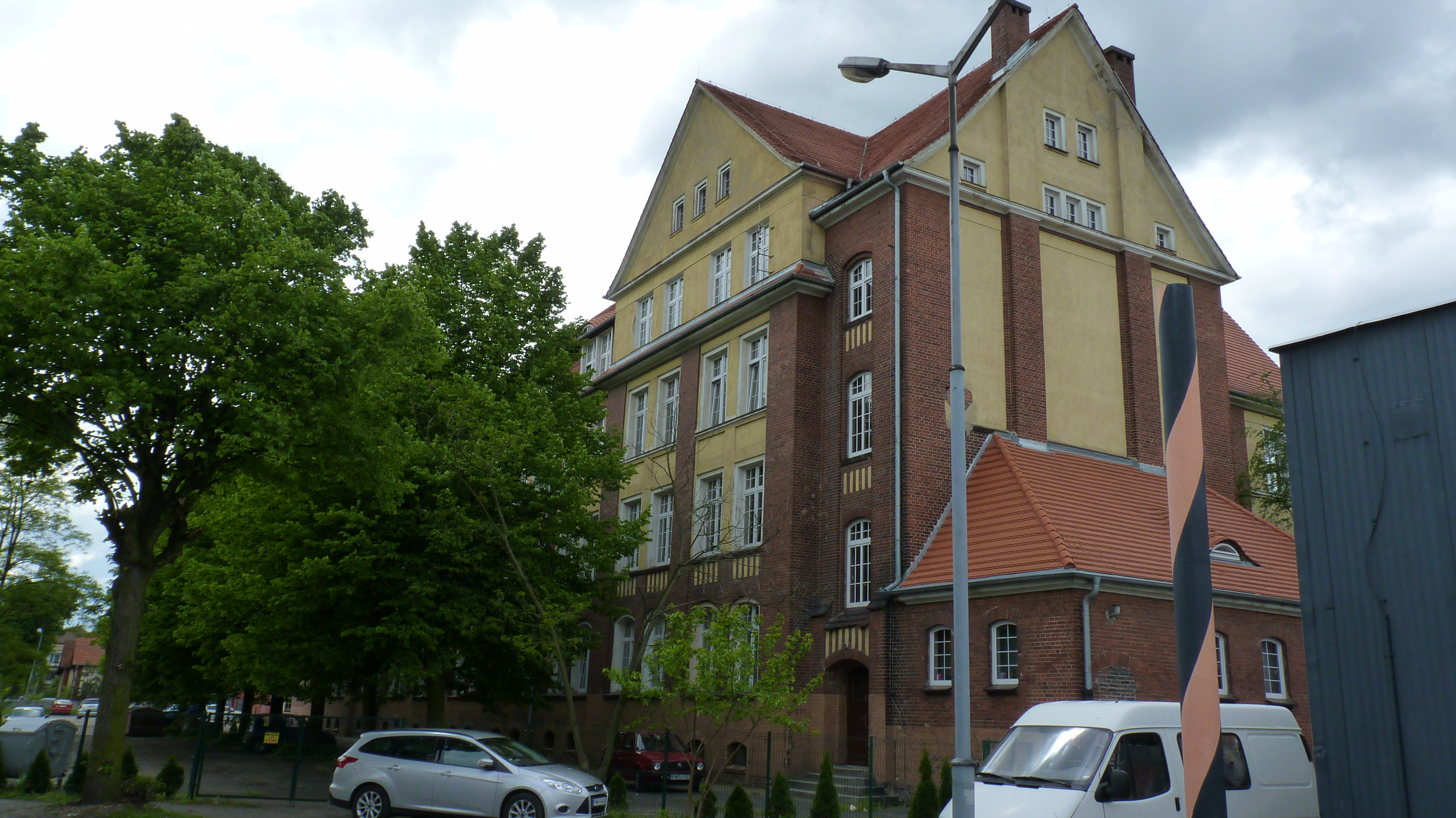
Old barracks building

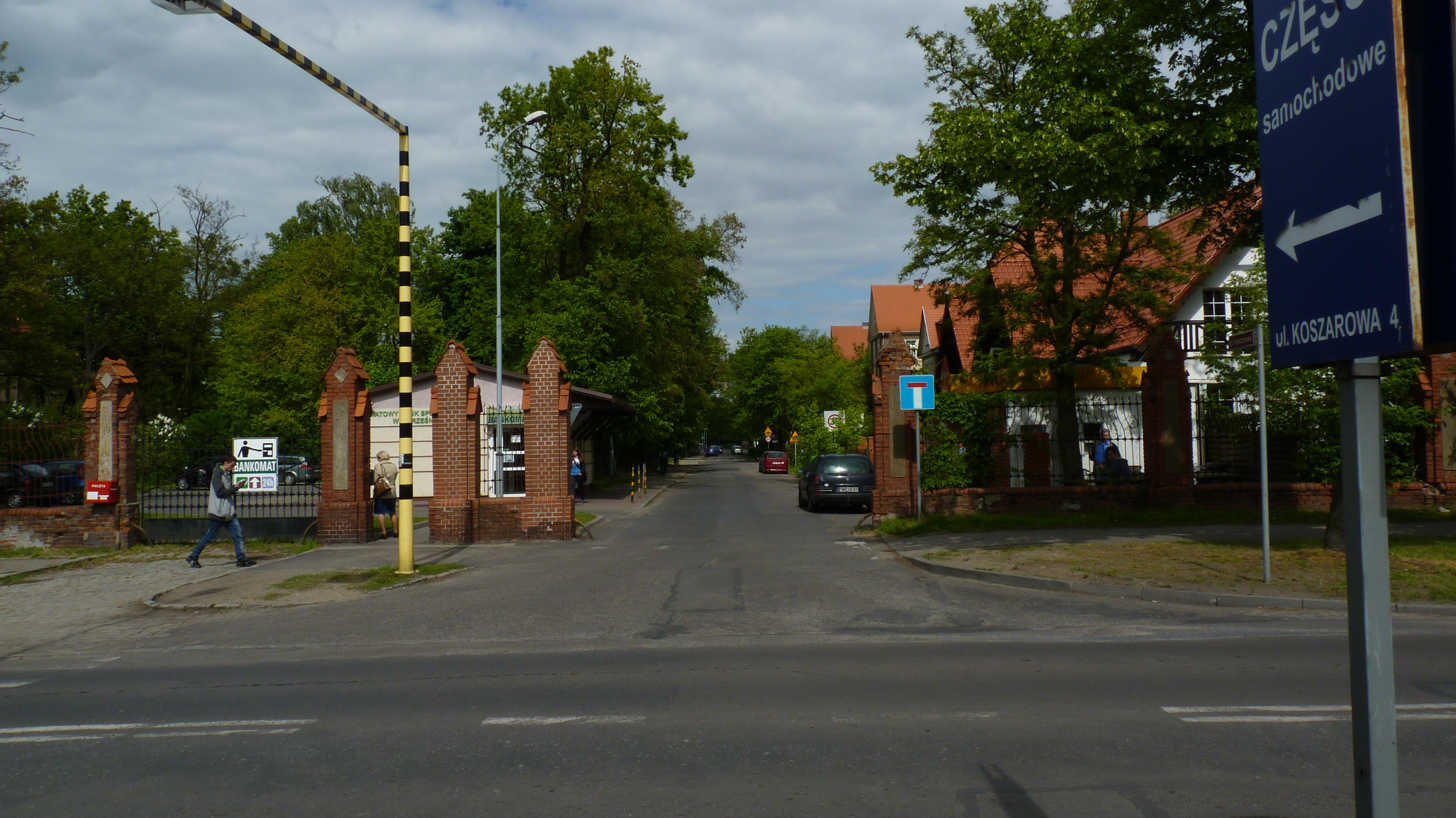
Koszarowa Street

== Bibliography ==
- "Września. Dawne koszary pruskie" (in Polish).
- Marian Torzewski (red.) (2006). Września. Historia miasta. Września: Muzeum Regionalne im. Dzieci Wrzesińskich we Wrześni. pp. 97, 454–456. ISBN 978-83-924220-0-6.
