= District office building, Września =

Building of the district office in Września
- Budynek starostwa powiatowego we Wrześni
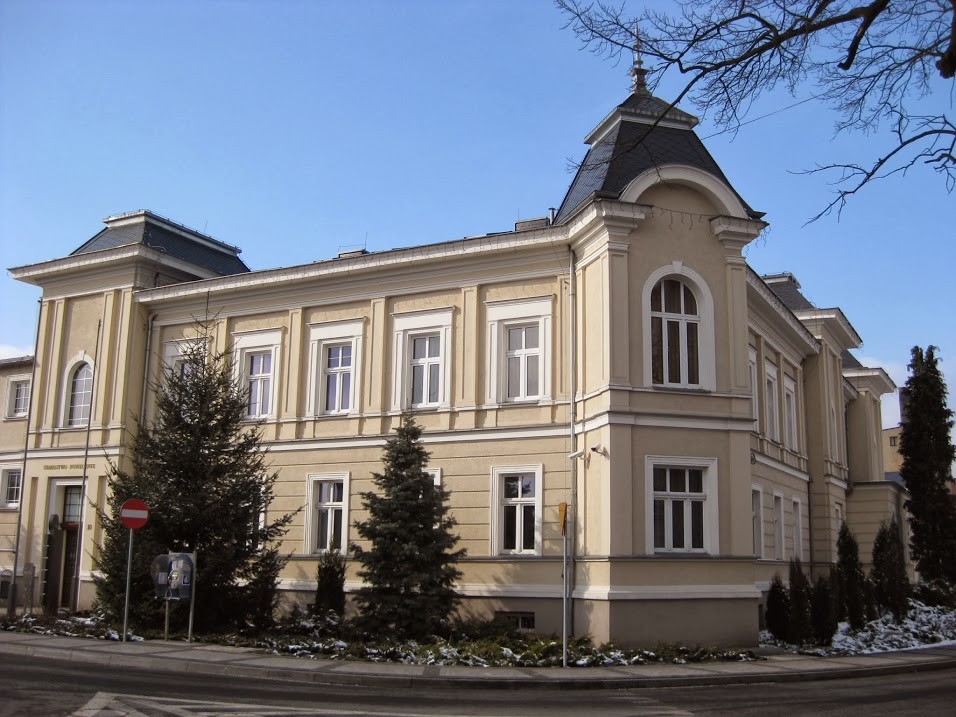

- Location within Poland

General information
- Location: Września County, Poland, Poland
- Coordinates: 52°19′47.75″N 17°34′07.75″E
- Construction started: 19th/20th century

Design and construction
- Architects: Emst Paulus and Olaf Lilloe

The District office, Września (Polish: Budynek starostwa we Wrześni) is the office building in which administrative functions for Września County are carried out. It is located south of the town's market (Rynek), on Chopin Street. During the Partitions of Poland, the building was called the "landratura", and the adjacent starost's villa was referred to as the Landrat's villa, as Września was then part of the Kingdom of Prussia.

== Creation ==
Up to the 17th century, the land that now houses the office and adjacent villa was occupied by a cemetery belonging to the Church of the Holy Spirit. After the liquidation of the church, the plot remained neglected and unused for a long time. In 1848, it was purchased by Xavier Stelmachowski, a builder from Września. Two years later, part of the cemetery land was purchased to build the headquarters of the district authorities for Września County, which had been created in 1818. The remainder of the land was purchased in 1911 with the idea of building a landrat's villa.

== Post-war period ==
Until 1945, the building was used in accordance with its original purpose, namely serving as a district office and apartment for the governor. Since World War II, the building has been overhauled and modernized several times. In 1970, the ground floor of the villa was adapted into a place for weddings. The desk of the Municipal Council is also located in the building; from 1975, the building was also the seat of the Municipal Council. Ever since Września County was re-created in 1999, the building has been restored to its original function as a district office.

== Gallery ==
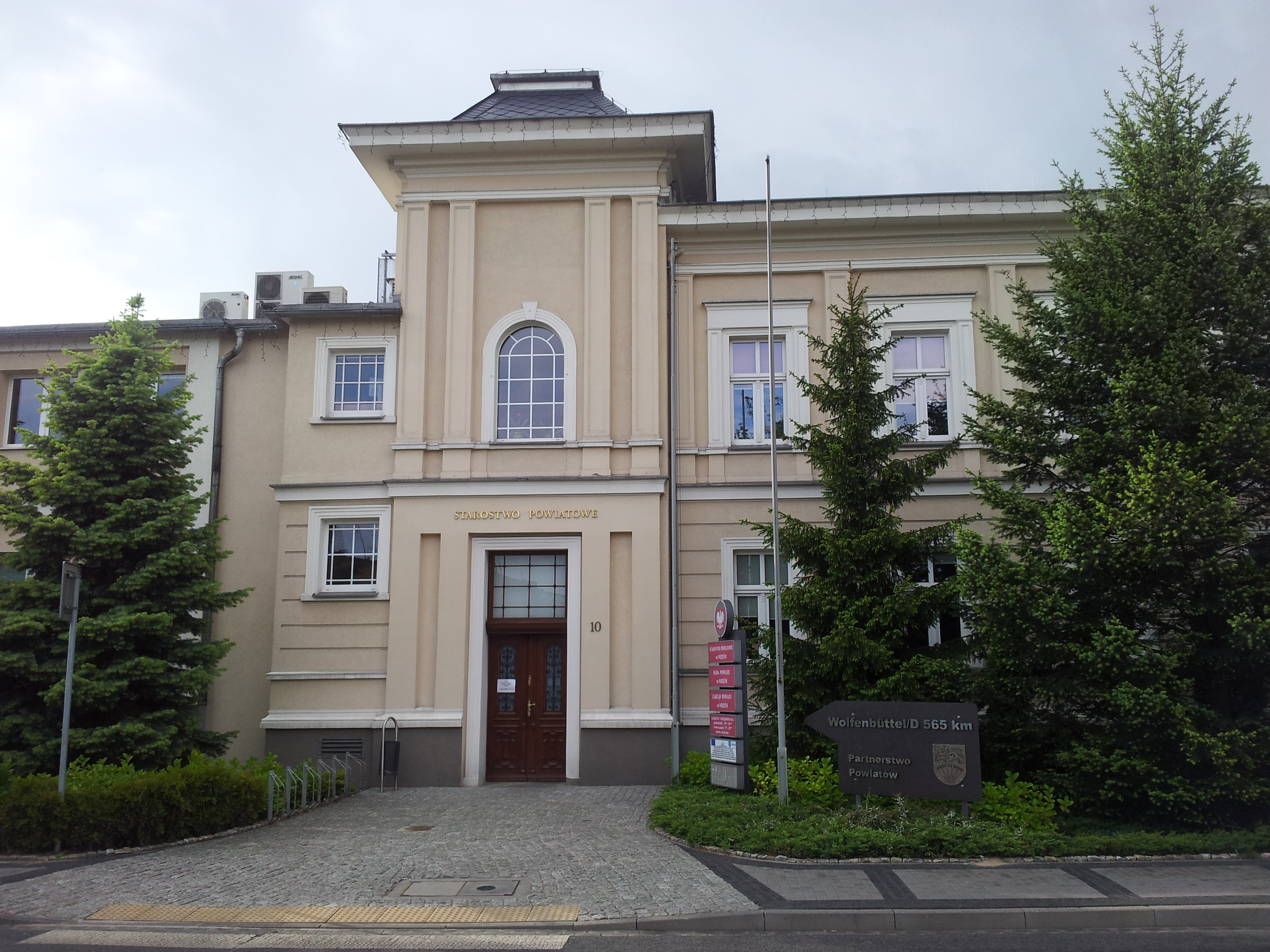
The entrance of the main district office building.

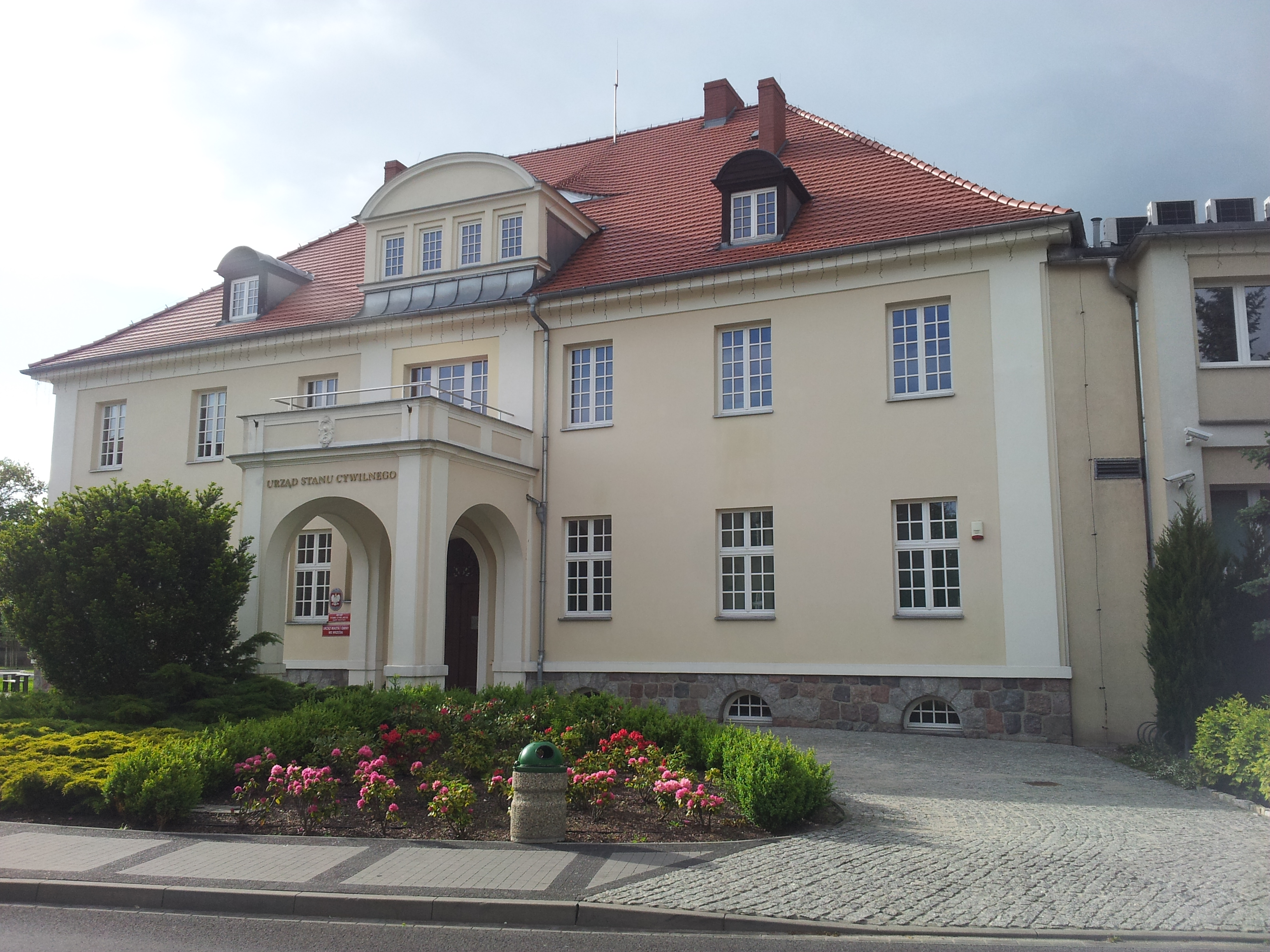
District office building from Chopin St.

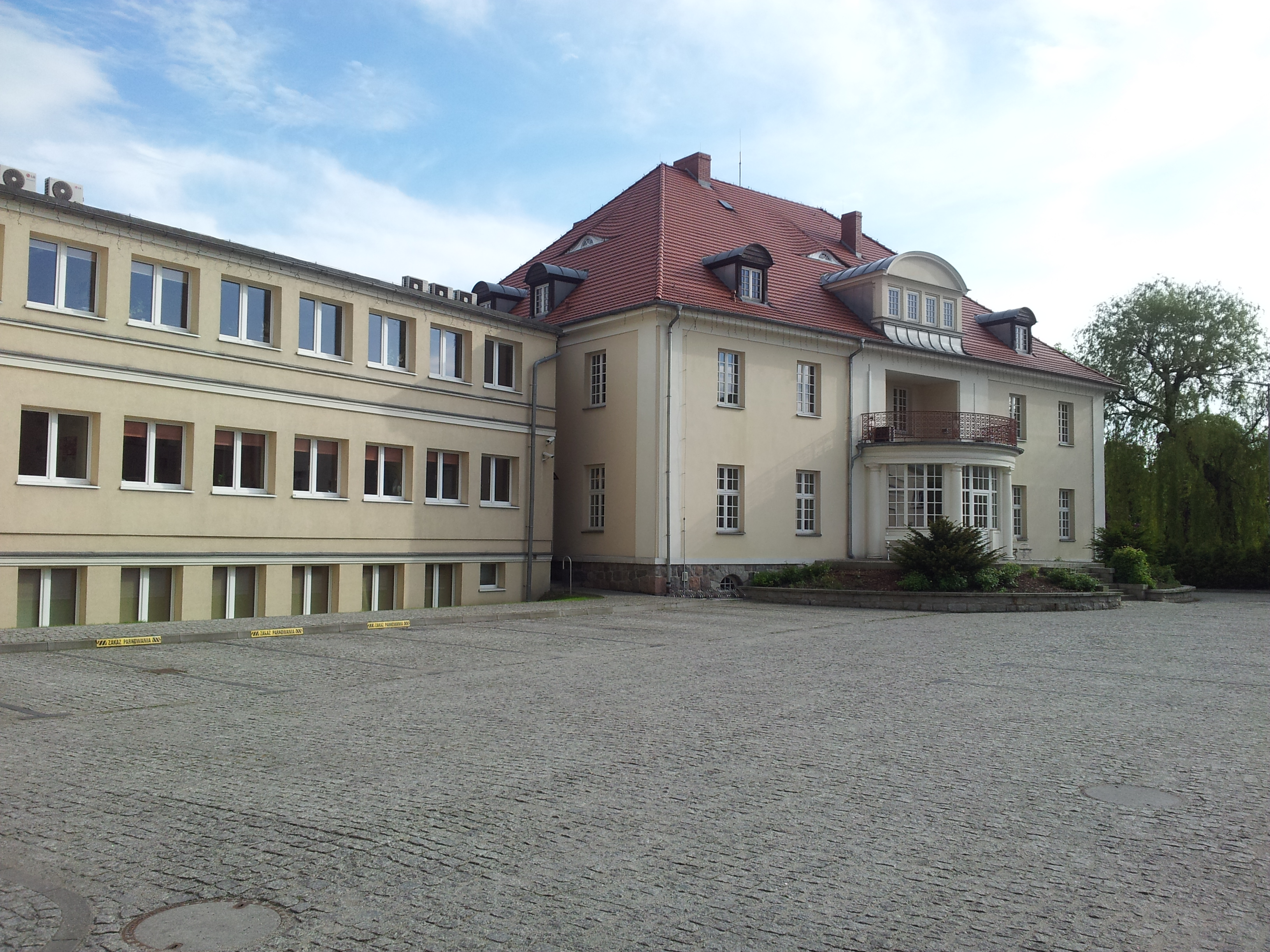
District office building and connector of building from Moniuszko St.

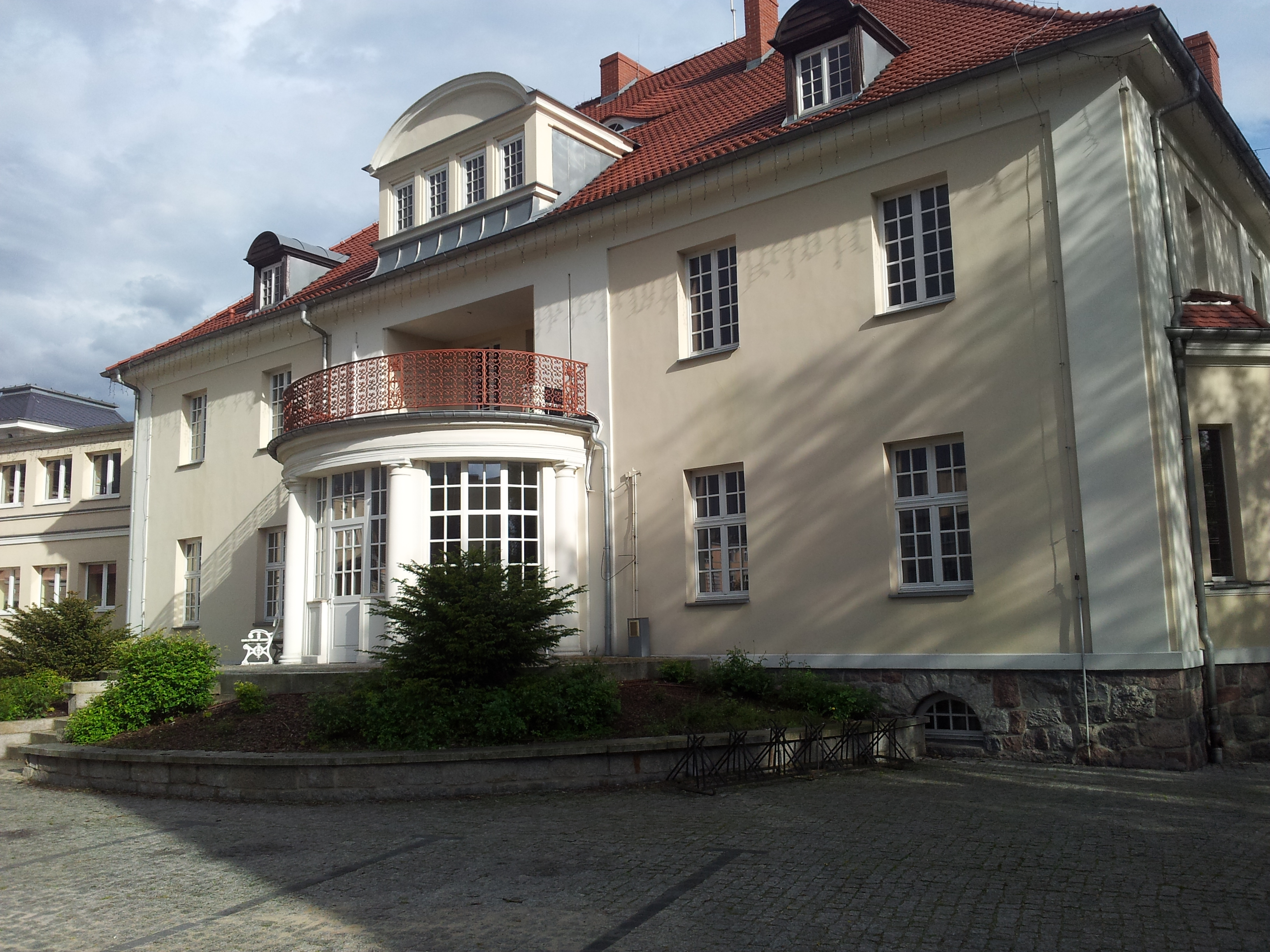
District office building from Moniuszko St.

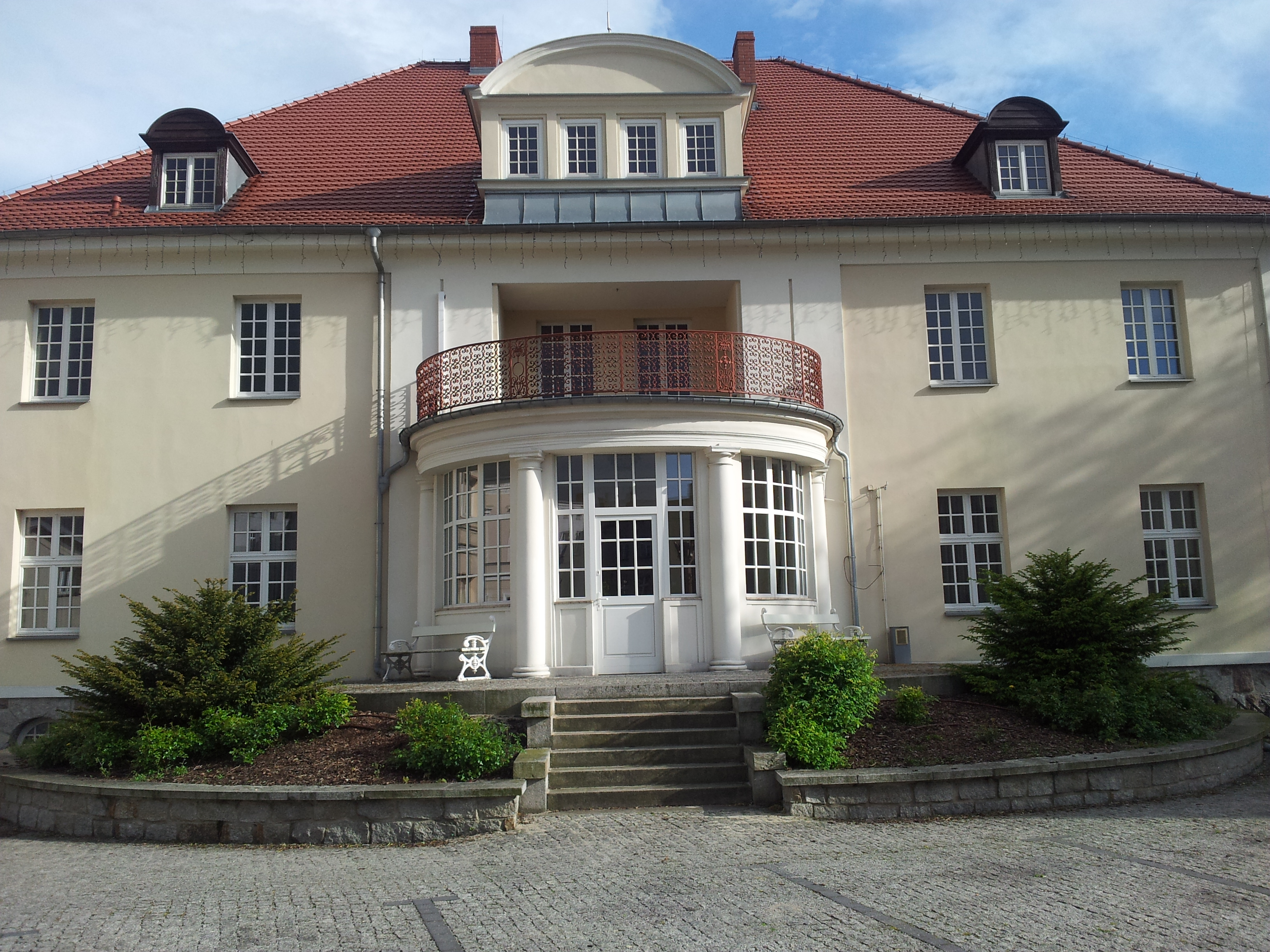
District office building from Moniuszko St.

District office building - vector

== Bibliography ==
- Torzewski, Marian (2006). Września: historia miasta. Września: Muzeum Regionalne im. Dzieci Wrzesińskich. pp. 446–447. ISBN 83-924220-0-7.
