= Września Miasto railway station =

Railway station in Września, Poland

Września Miasto

General information
- Location: Września, Poland
- Coordinates: 52°19′16″N 17°33′40″E
- Line: Września District Railway

History
- Opened: 1898
- Closed: 1976
Location

Września Miasto (lit. 'Września Miasto') was a narrow-gauge railway stop in Września, Greater Poland Voivodeship, Poland.

It was a part of the Września District Railway. It was located on the square at the intersection of today's Kaliska and Wrocławska streets (at what is now a Shell petrol station) in Zawodzie. The stop was founded in 1898 and operated until 1976.

== See also ==
- Września railway station

== Sources ==
- Marian Torzewski (red.): Września. Historia miasta. Muzeum Regionalne im. Dzieci Wrzesińskich we Wrześni, Września, 2006, ISBN 978-83-924220-0-6, s. 227-229 i 347
