= Września =

Town in Greater Poland Voivodeship, Poland

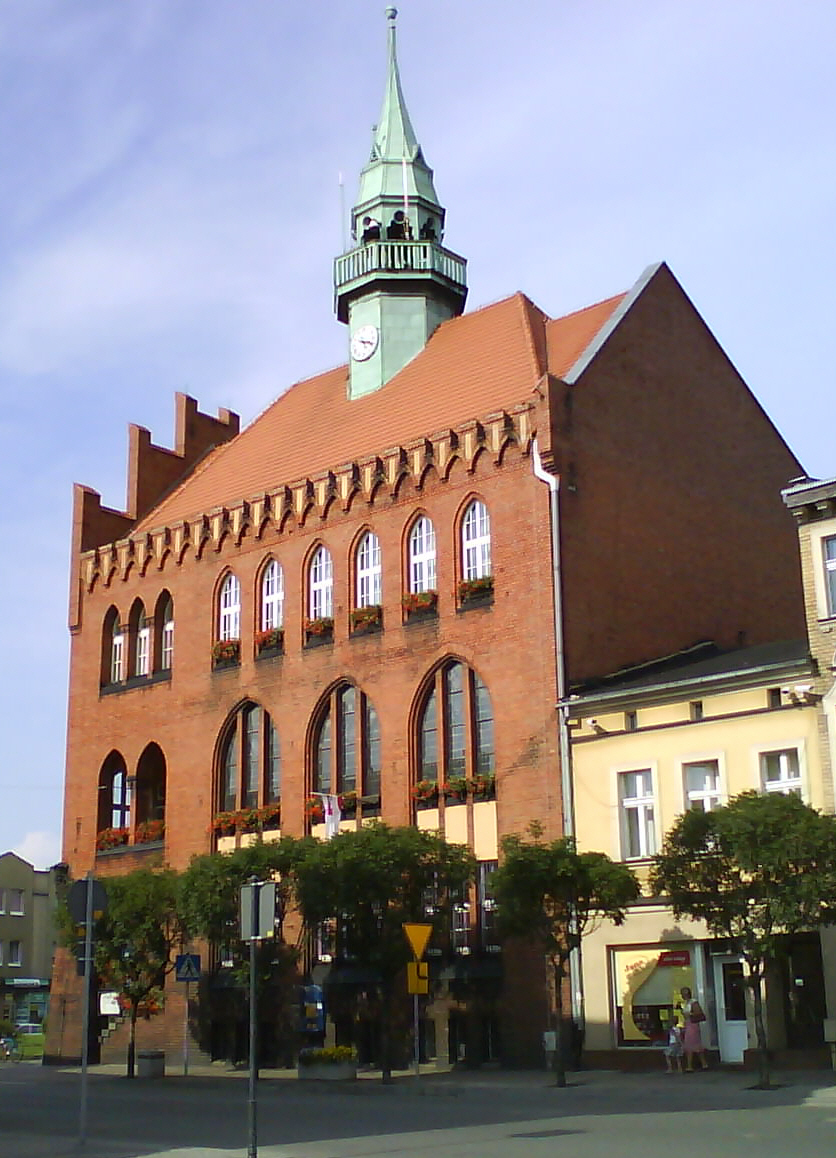
- Town hall

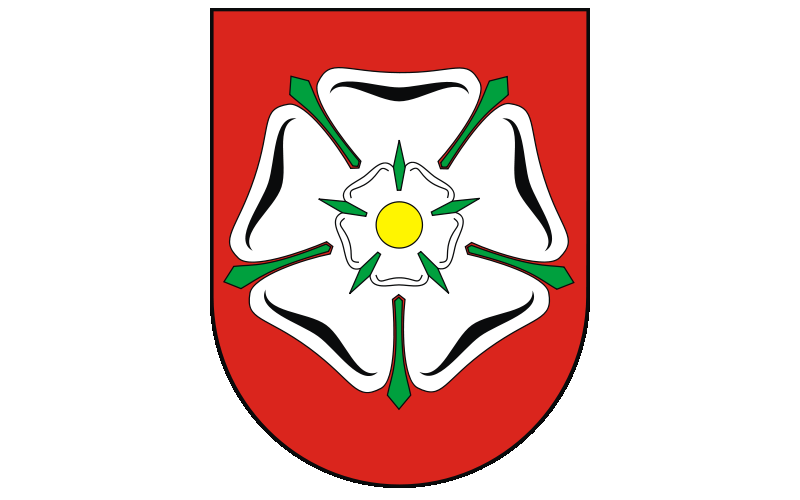
- Flag Coat of arms

- Location within Poland
- Coordinates: 52°20′N 17°35′E
- Country: Poland
- Voivodeship: Greater Poland
- County: Września
- Gmina: Września
- First mentioned: 1256
- Town rights: 1375

Government
  - Mayor: Tomasz Kałużny (PO)

Area
  - Total: 12.73 km^{2} (4.92 sq mi)
- Highest elevation: 110 m (360 ft)
- Lowest elevation: 90 m (300 ft)

Population (2021)
  - Total: 29,483
  - Density: 2,316/km^{2} (5,998/sq mi)
- Time zone: UTC+1 (CET)
  - Summer (DST): UTC+2 (CEST)
- Postal code: 62-300
- Area code: +48 61
- Car plates: PWR
- Website: http://www.wrzesnia.pl

Września ([ˈvʐɛɕɲa]) is a town in west-central Poland near Poznań, with 28,600 inhabitants (1995). It is situated in the Września County, Greater Poland Voivodeship, on the Wrześnica River.

== History ==
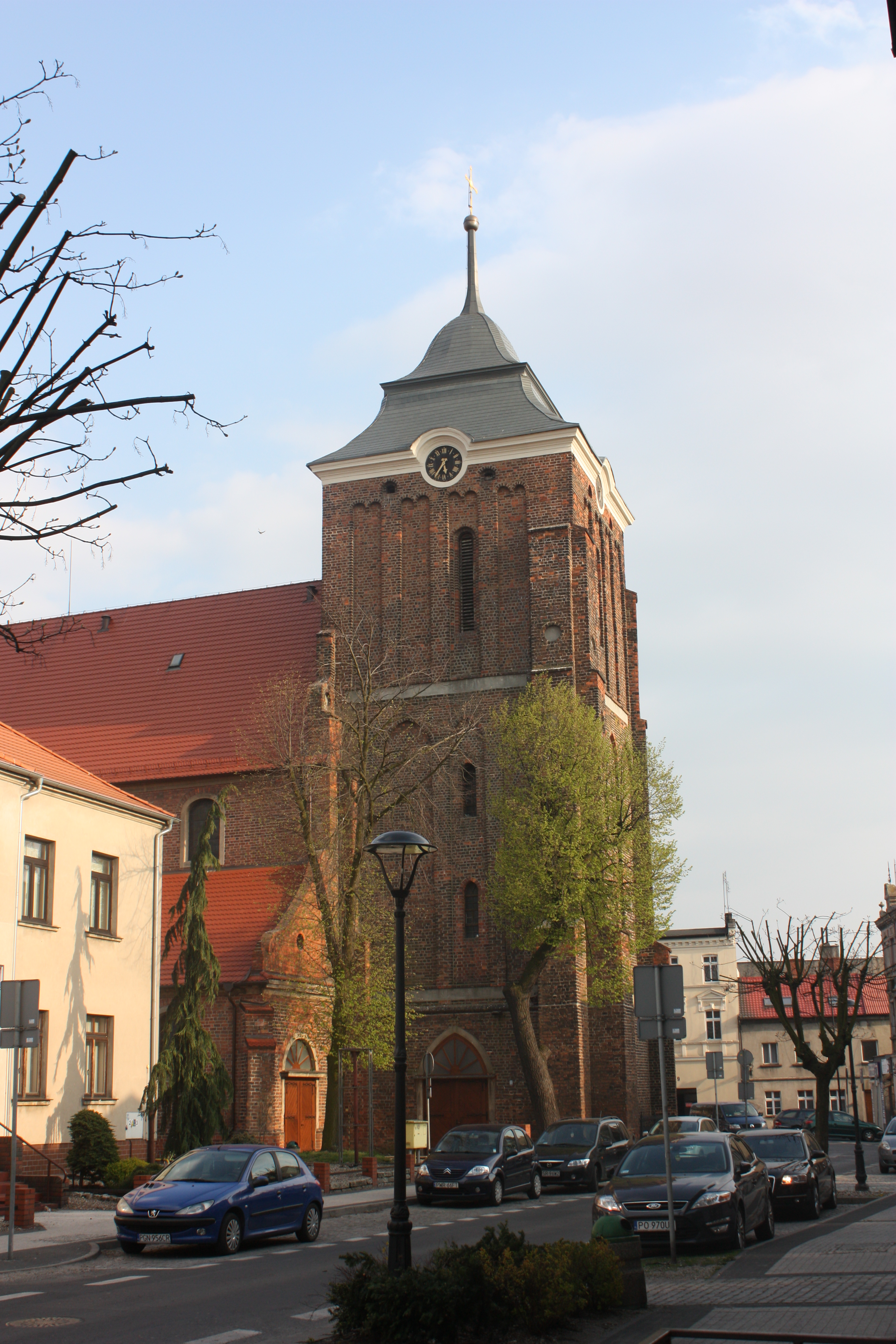
Gothic Church of the Assumption of Mary

Września was first mentioned in 1256 in a document issued in Poznań. Early sources speak of Wressna (1317) or Wresna (1364). Września was granted town privileges before 1357. It was a private town, owned by various Polish nobles families, administratively located in the Kalisz Voivodeship of the Greater Poland Province of the Kingdom of Poland. The coat of arms of Września is the Poraj coat of arms of the Poraj family, the first owners of the town. Annual fairs and weekly markets took place in the town. The town was burned down 1664 (other sources speak of 1656) in the war against Sweden. The majority of inhabitants were Poles, but since mid-17th century there have also been German settlers.

The town was annexed by the Kingdom of Prussia in 1793, following the Second Partition of Poland. After the successful Greater Poland uprising of 1806, it was regained by Poles and included within the short-lived Duchy of Warsaw, but it fell back to Prussia in 1815. To resist Germanisation policies local Poles founded numerous organizations, and also took part in the Greater Poland uprising (1848) and January Uprising (1863). On May 2, 1848, the Polish insurgents fought a victorious battle against the Prussians in the nearby village of Sokołowo, just north of Września. In 1875 Września gained a railway connection with Gniezno and Wrocław, and in 1882 also with Poznań.

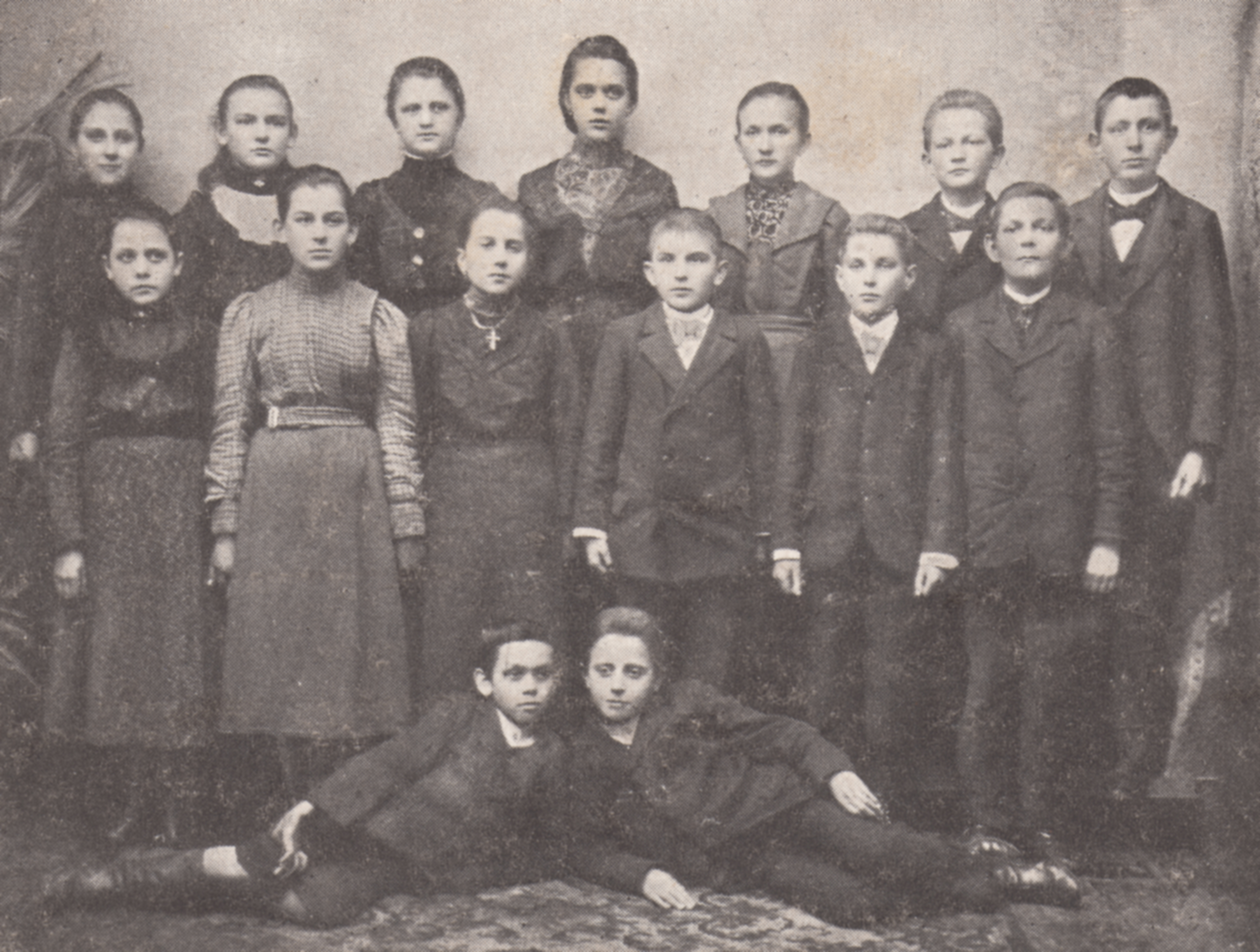
Children from Września who participated in the school strike in response to the banning of the Polish language.

Września is known in Poland for a school strike by Polish children in May 1901 in response to the intensification of Germanization (i.e. prohibition of the Polish language at school). The Polish language had long been tolerated in the schools, so the introduction of German as mandatory language led to protests. The controversy led to drawn-out protests between parents and authorities. For refusing to speak German, Polish children were severely beaten by Prussian teachers for several hours. Parents who tried to break into the school and protect their children from Prussian teachers were punished later by a Prussian court stating that their actions were "atrocious acts against the state". The strike spread to neighboring cities and eventually ended in 1904.

In 1905 the town was inhabited by about 7000 people of which 65.4% were Poles, 28.9% Germans and 5.5% Jews. In the surrounding county, Poles comprised 85.6% of the population. The hundred-year-long Prussian rule came to an end with the outbreak of the Wielkopolska Uprising in 1918, shortly after Poland regained independence, and in 1920, the town officially once again became part of Poland. About 800 local Poles formed the Września Volunteer Legion (Legia Ochotnicza Wrzesińska) under the command of Stanisław Mycielski to fight against the Soviet invasion. It was around this time that construction of the district office building was completed. The 68th Infantry Regiment was stationed in Września since 1921.

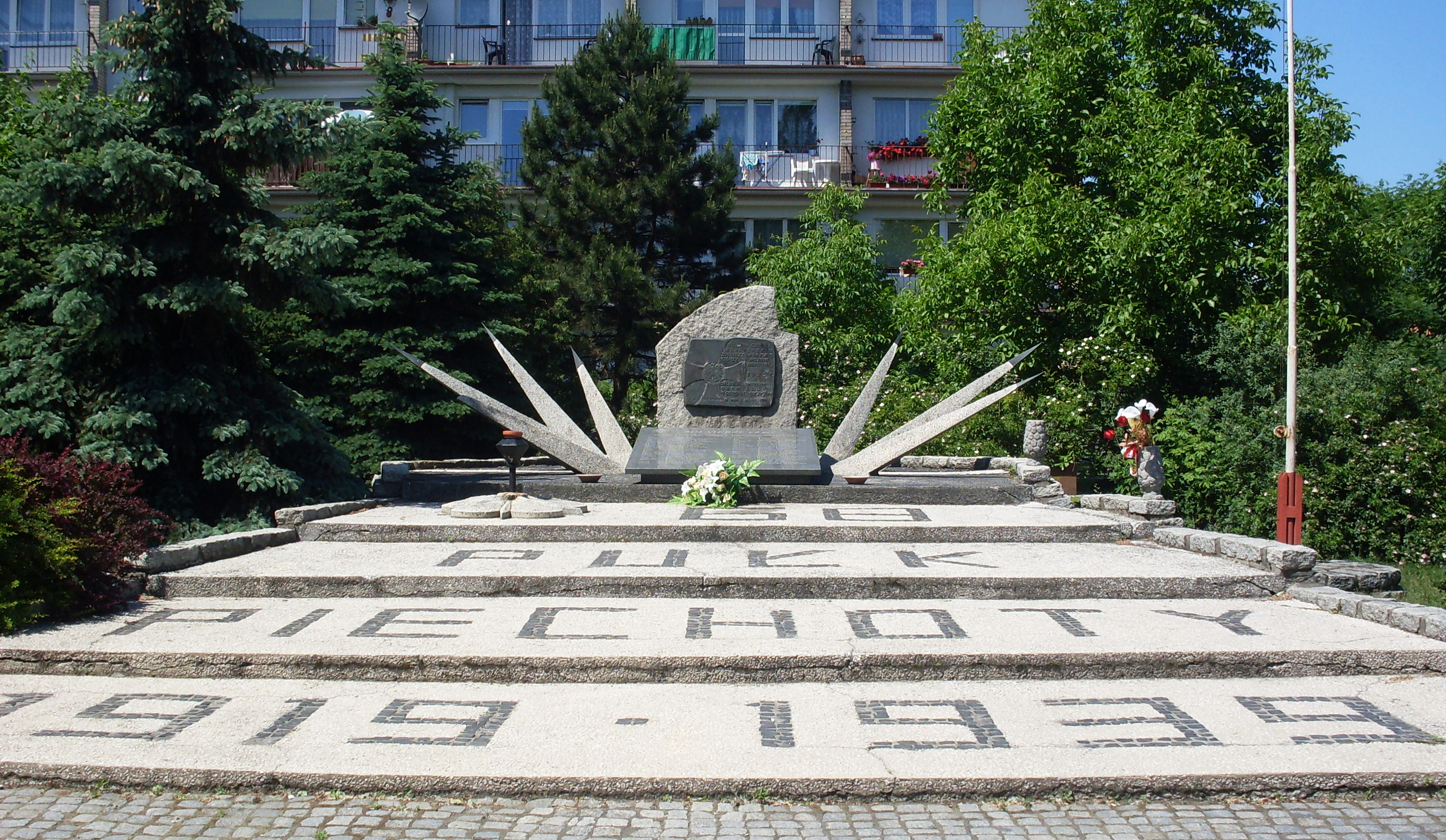
Memorial to the 68th Infantry Regiment, which fought in the Polish 1939 defensive war

With the invasion of Poland and the outbreak of the Second World War, the German Wehrmacht occupied the city on September 10, 1939. It was incorporated into Reichsgau Wartheland as a part of the district or county (kreis) of Wreschen. The Germans carried out mass arrests of local Poles, who were afterwards imprisoned in the local prison, and soon murdered in large massacres in nearby forests in October and November 1939 (see also: Intelligenzaktion). Poles were also subjected to mass expulsions, however the Polish resistance movement remained active throughout the war. The synagogue was destroyed in 1940 and a camp for French prisoners of war operated in the area. Additionally, from April 1941 to 1943 a forced labor camp for Jews operated in the vicinity of the town. Following the arrival of the Red Army and the end of the war the town was made part of the People's Republic of Poland.

In Września there is an antique coach house at the Kosciuszko Street. From 1975 to 1998, it was part of the Poznań Voivodeship. In 1979, the Maria Konopnicka Monument designed by Mieczysław Welter was unveiled to pay tribute to poet and writer Maria Konopnicka for her support of the Września schoolchildren during the Września school strike (1901–1904).

=== Jewish community ===
Among the members of the community special mention may be made of Rabbi Ẓebi Hirsch, and his father Rabbi Aaron Mirels, and the Bible commentator Rabbi Meïr Löb Malbim.

Ẓebi Mirels, was the author of the "Mispar Ẓeba'am", and presented a Hebrew hymn to General Möllendorf when the latter was sent by king Frederick William II of Prussia to receive the allegiance of the new province of southern Prussia. Rabbi Aaron Mirels, the author of the "Bet Aharon", is buried in the cemetery at Jelenia Góra in Silesia. In Września, Malbim wrote his first work, the collection of annotations on the first chapters of the Shulḥan 'Aruk, Oraḥ Ḥayyim, which laid the foundation of his renown as a scholar. The musical director, Louis Lewandowski was also born in Września on April 3, 1821.

== Sights and monuments ==
Various sights of Września

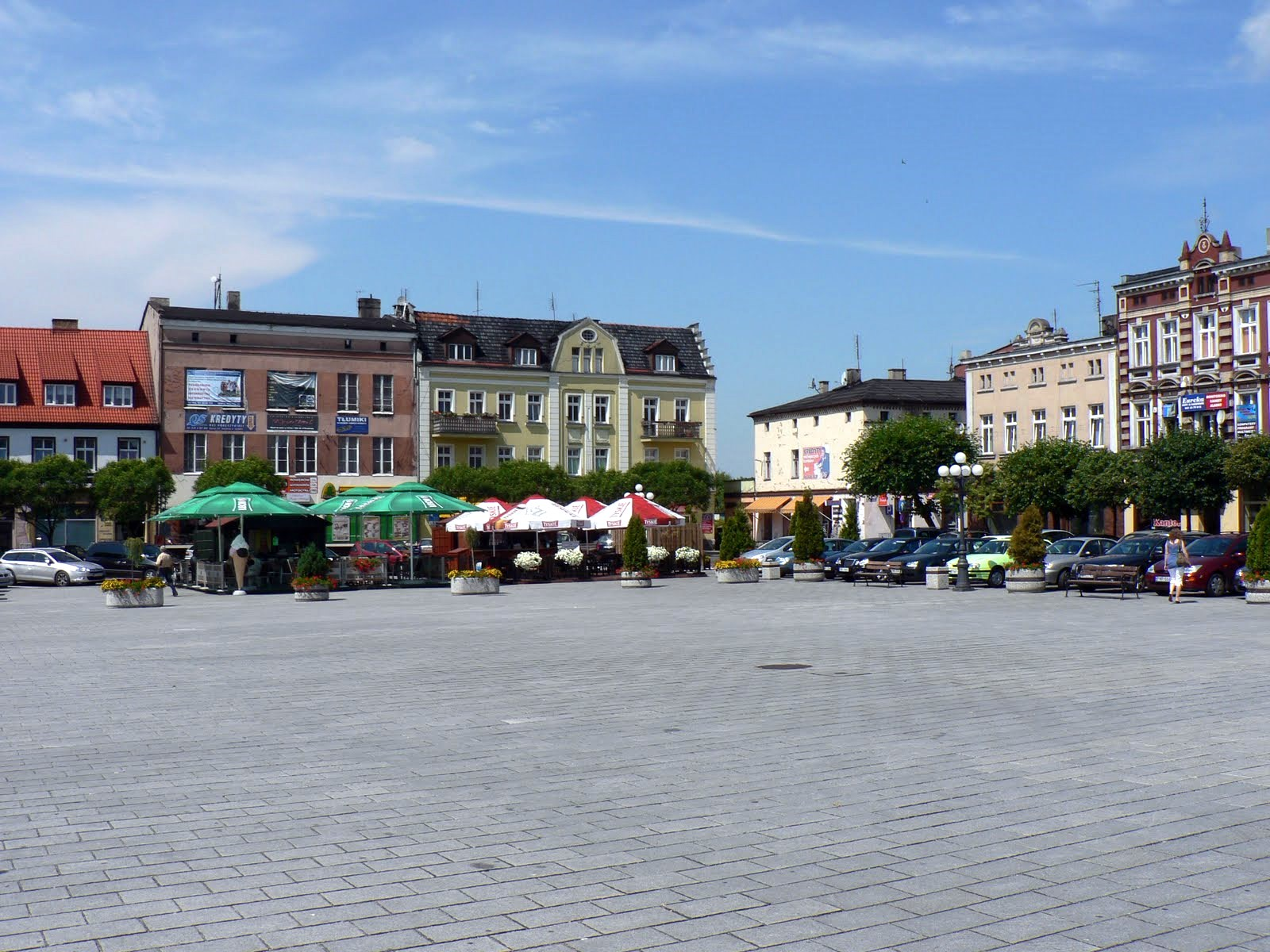
Market Square

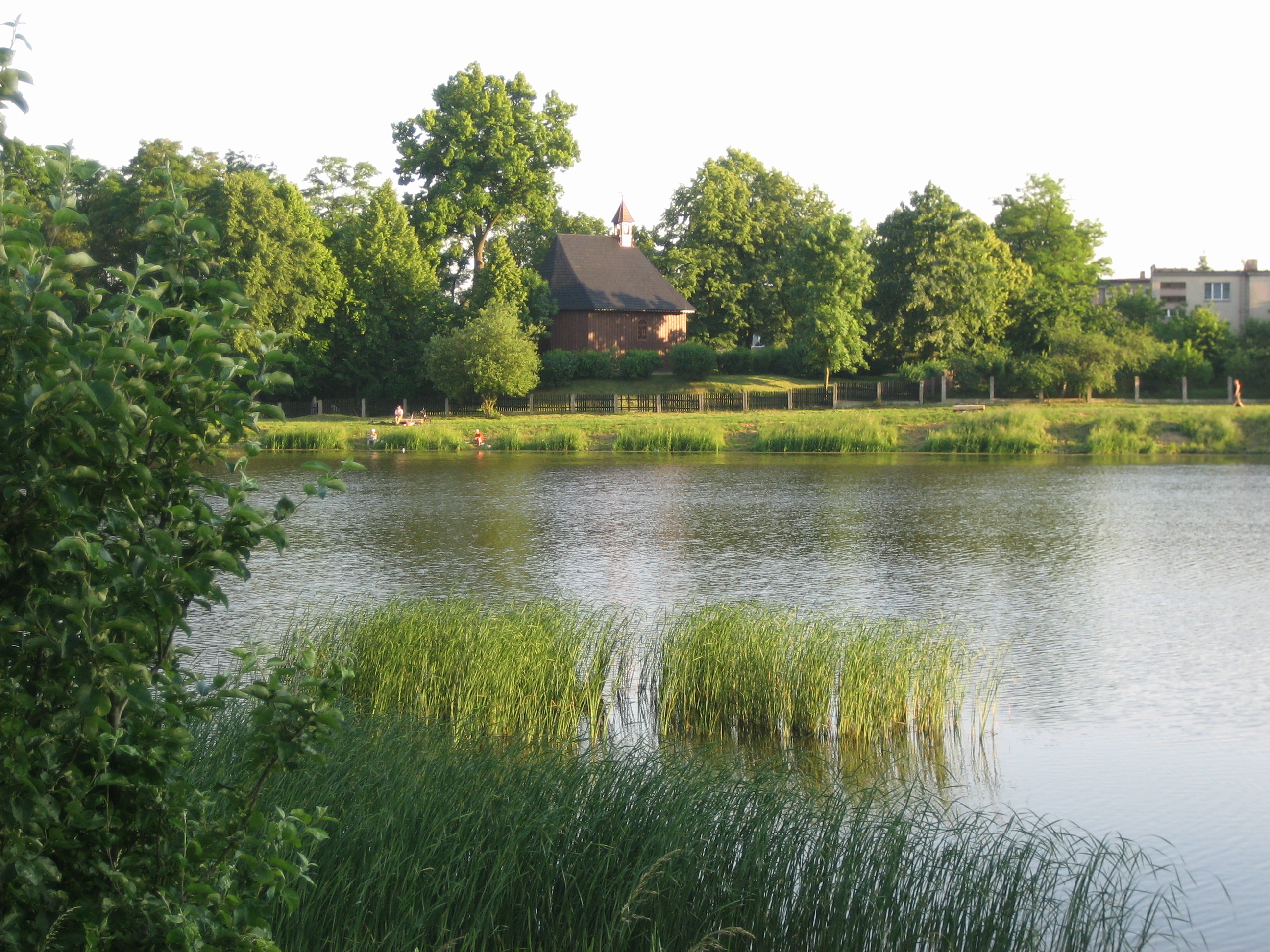
Wrzesińskie Lake with the Holy Cross church in the background

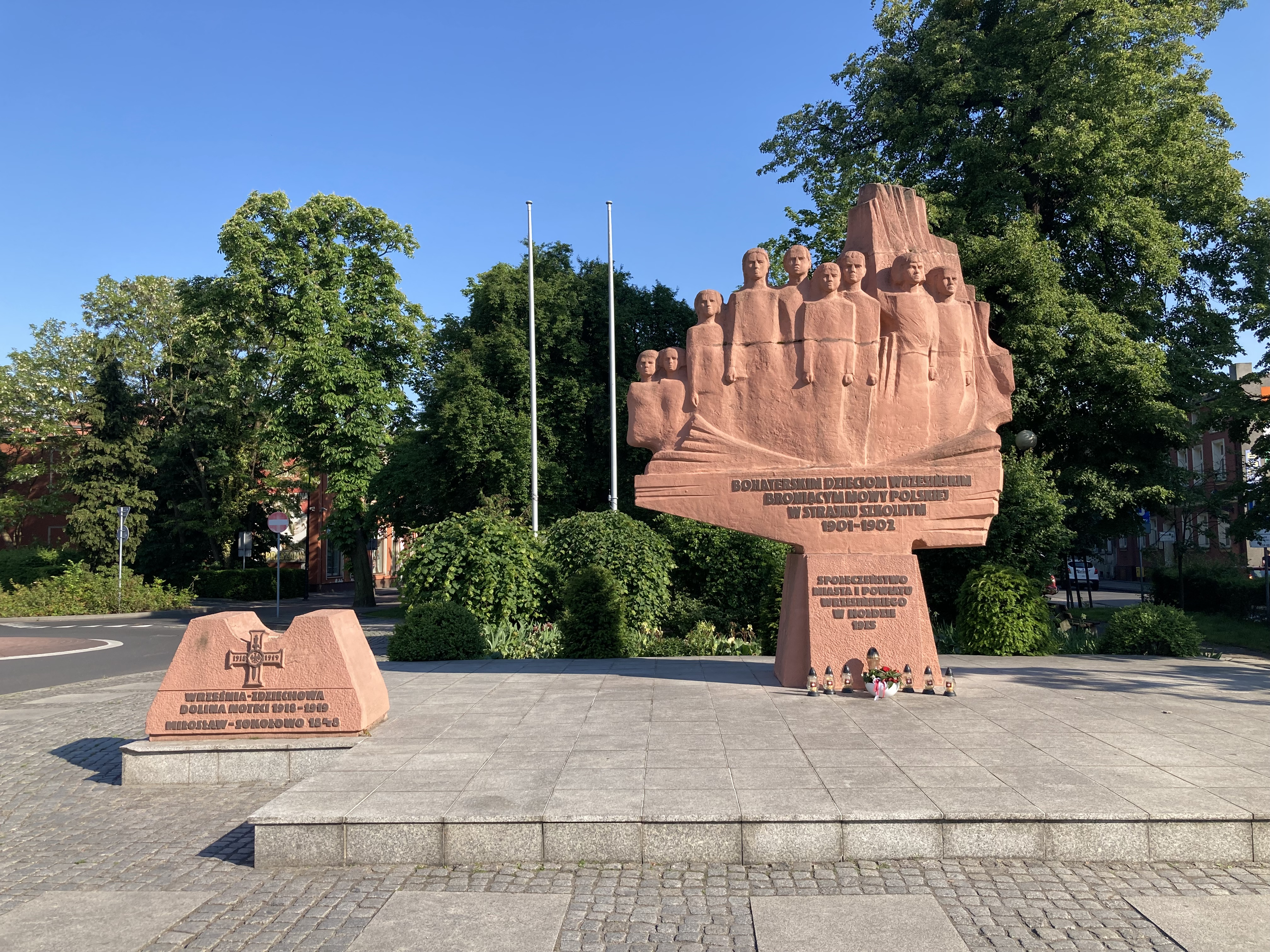
Monument to Września Children

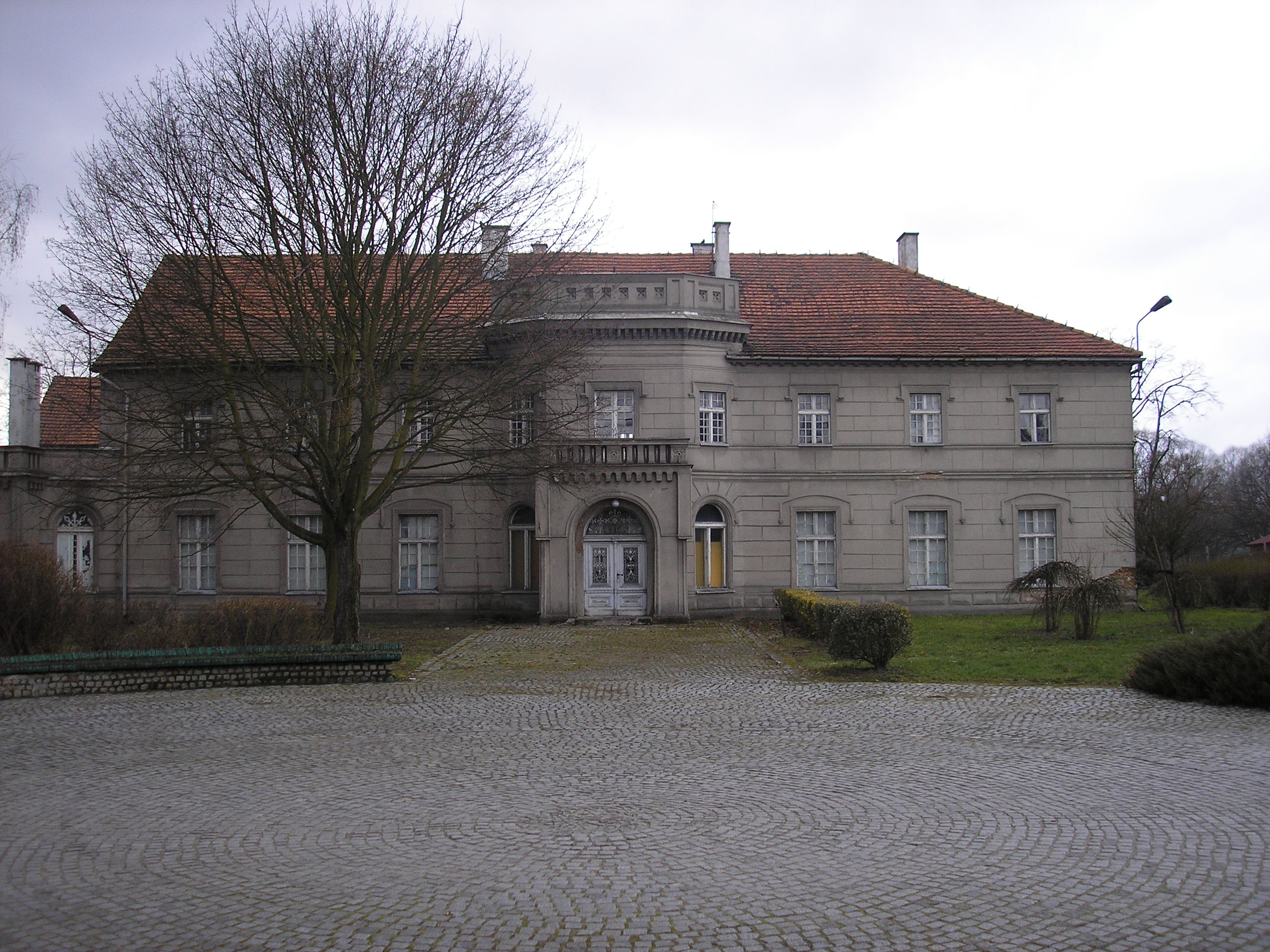
Poniński Palace

- Gothic Church of the Assumption of Mary
- Holy Cross Church
- Town Hall
- Rynek (Market Square) filled with colourful historic townhouses
- Park im. Marszałka Józefa Piłsudskiego
- Monument to Września Children
- Poniński Palace with the Children of Września Park
- Maria Konopnicka Monument
- World War II memorials, including the Katyń massacre memorial, 68th Infantry Regiment Monument, and the Monument to the scouts of Września killed during the war
- Graves of Polish insurgents of 1848 and 1918–1919 at the local cemetery
- Wrzesińskie Lake
- Holy Spirit church
- District office building
- Courthouse

=== Water towers ===
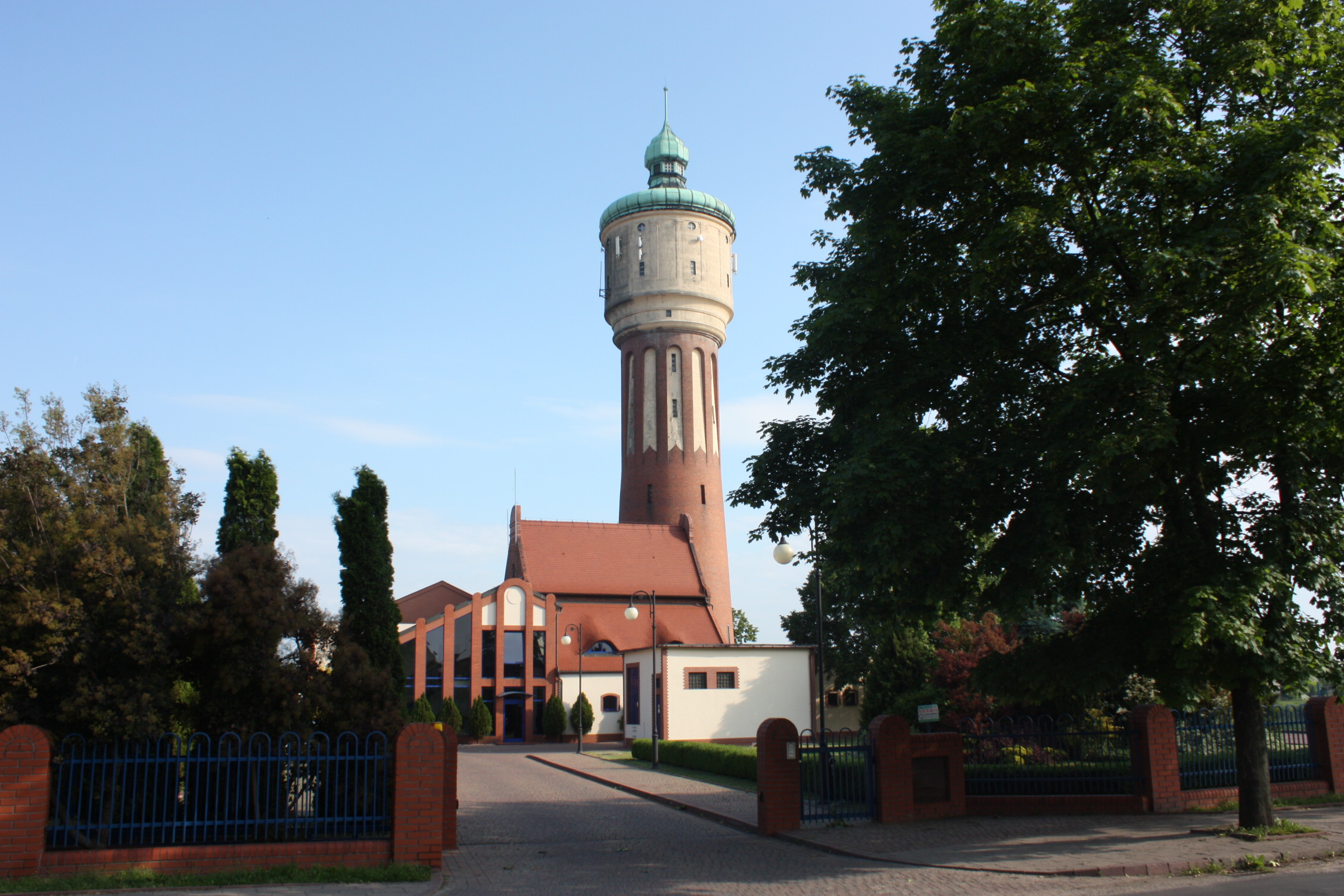
Tower at the water treatment plant

There are three water towers in Września, which once supplied the town with water. Two water towers are still in use. The tallest was built in 1904 (some sources say 1907 and 1911) and is the highest building in the vicinity. The tower is 64 metres (210 ft) tall and its top is finished with a brass dome. The building belongs to the municipal Water Supply and Sewerage Enterprise. Next to the water tower stands the water treatment plant. The tower is near two ponds, allotment gardens and Polytechnic School.

== Education ==
=== Primary schools ===
- Samorządowa Szkoła Podstawowa nr 1 im. 68 Pułku Piechoty
- Samorządowa Szkoła Podstawowa nr 2 im. Dzieci Wrzesińskich
- Samorządowa Szkoła Podstawowa nr 3 im. Mikołaja Kopernika
- Samorządowa Szkoła Podstawowa nr 6 im. Jana Pawła II

=== Middle schools ===
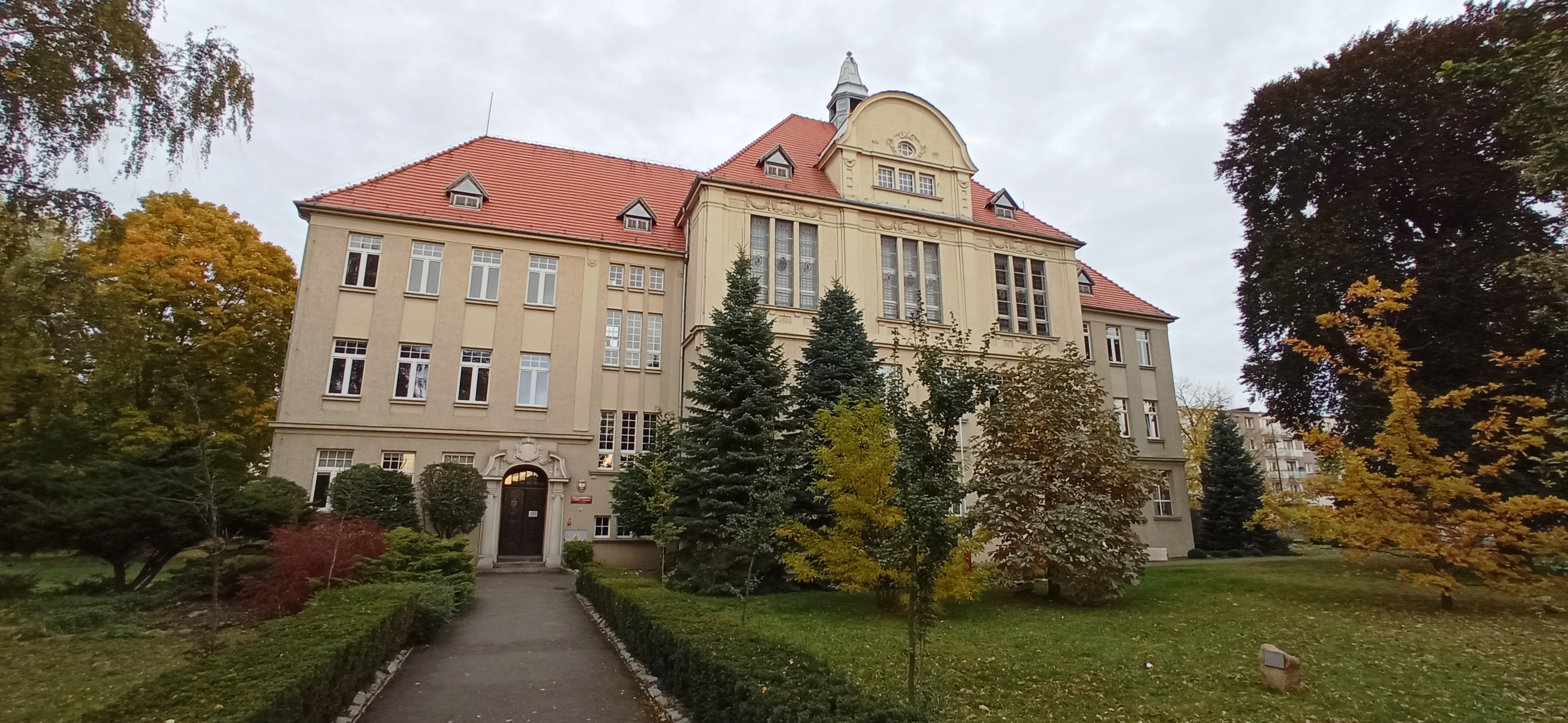
Liceum Ogólnokształcące im. Henryka Sienkiewicza

- Liceum Ogólnokształcące im. Henryka Sienkiewicza
- Zespół Szkół Politechnicznych im. Bohaterów Monte Cassino
- Zespół Szkół Zawodowych nr 2 im. Powstańców Wielkopolskich
- Zespół Szkół Technicznych i Ogólnokształcących im. gen. dr. Romana Abrahama

== Transport ==
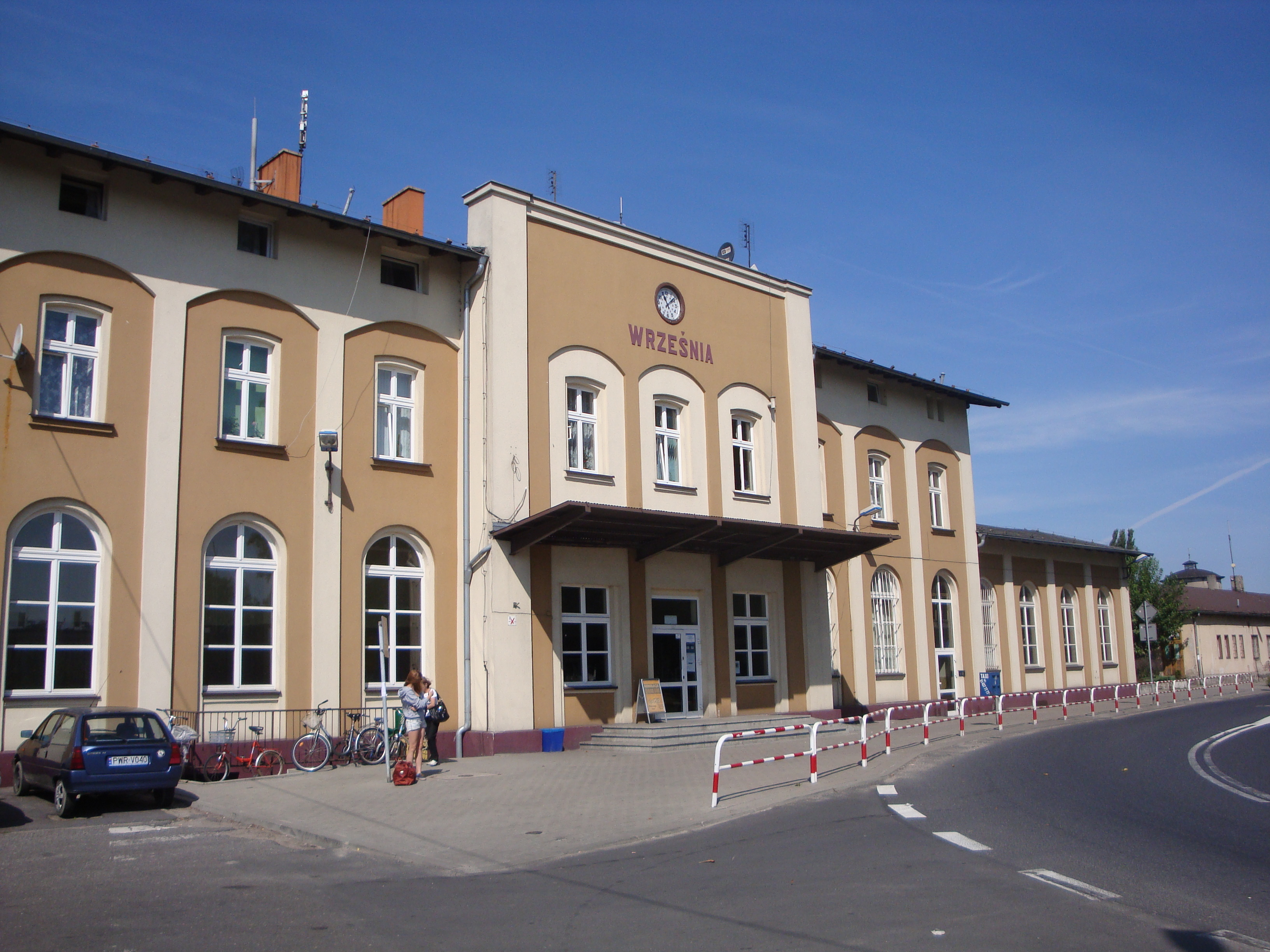
Września railway station

The Września railway station is located in the town, and there are also two defunct narrow-gauge railway stations, Września Miasto and Września Wąskotorowa.

== Cuisine ==
Września is one of the production sites of the Greater Poland liliput cheese (ser liliput wielkopolski), a traditional regional Polish cheese, protected as a traditional food by the Ministry of Agriculture and Rural Development of Poland.

== Notable people ==
- Friedrich-Wilhelm Bock (1897–1978), general
- Zygmunt Gorgolewski (1845–1903), architect
- Łukasz Koszarek (born 1984), basketball player
- Jarosław Kukulski (1944–2010), composer
- Louis Lewandowski (1821–1894), musician
- Peter J. Lucas (born 1962), actor
- Malbim (1809–1879), rabbi and Bible commentator

== See also ==
- Kreis Wreschen / Landkreis Wreschen
- Sport in Września
