= Church of St. Martin, Kaczanowo =

Coordinates: 52°17′30″N 17°35′01″E

St. Martin Church in Kaczanowo
- Kościół św. Marcina
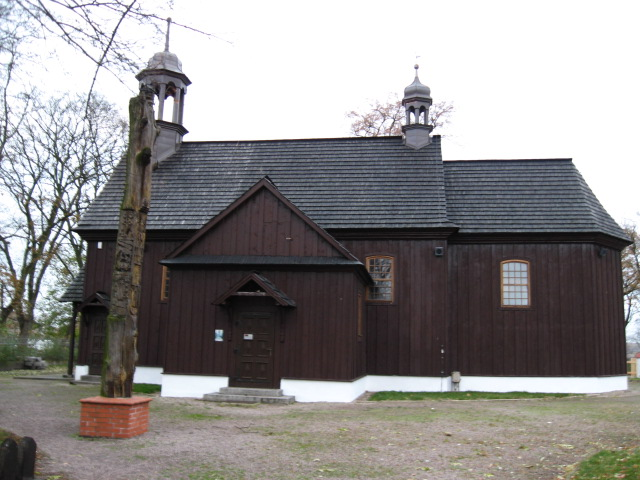
- Wooden Church of St. Martin
- St. Martin Church in Kaczanowo
- Location: Kaczanowo
- Country: Poland
- Denomination: Catholic Church

History
- Status: Parish Church
- Dedication: Saint Martin
- Consecrated: 28 August 1932

Architecture
- Functional status: Active

Specifications
- Materials: wood

The Church of St. Martin (Polish: Kościół św. Marcina) in Kaczanowo, Poland is a historic wooden church built in 1763–1765 in Wielkopolska Region. It is the second wooden church erected at the same location after the original structure fell apart. The actual parish existed from before 1404.

== Description ==
The St. Martin is a single-nave church, built in the popular style of Polish 18th century wooden churches. It was renovated in the 19th and early 20th century, with polychrome added in 1958 by Edmund Budasza. Next to the church, stands an intricately carved wooden pole, previously within the grounds of the old church cemetery. It was erected in 1854 and made by local amateur artist Józef Kalasanty Jakubowski (1786-1877), professor of Gymnasium of St. Mary Magdalene in Poznań and founder of local library. Placed on top is the figure of St. John of Nepomuk (Jan Nepomucen). There is a number of smaller carvings of various subjects on all sides including themes from Polish history.

== Gallery ==
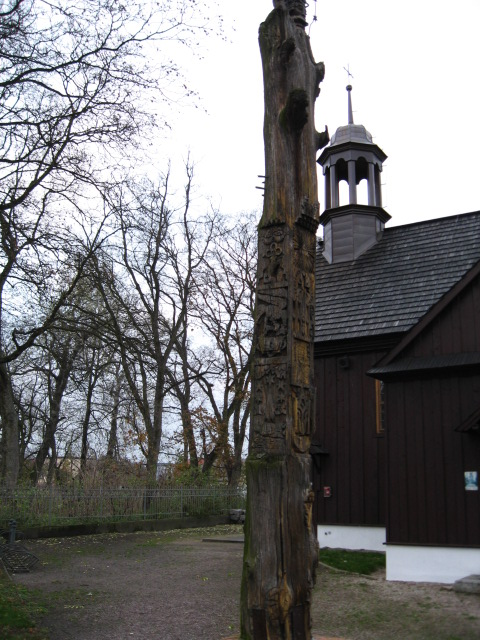
Wooden pole at the church

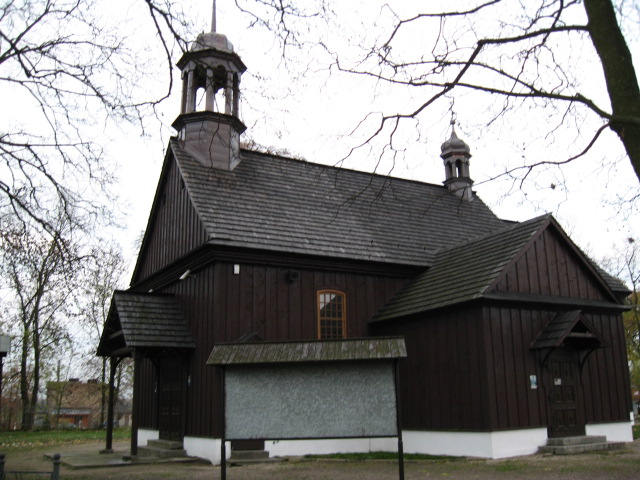
View from bulletin board

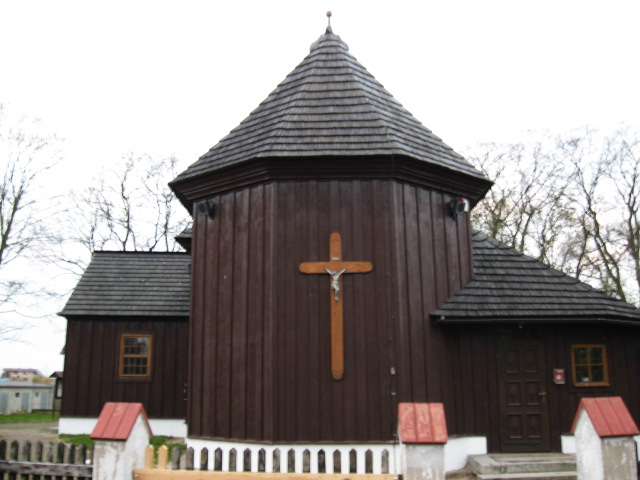
View from the back
