= Manor house in Chocicza Wielka =

- Dwór w Chociczy Wielkiej
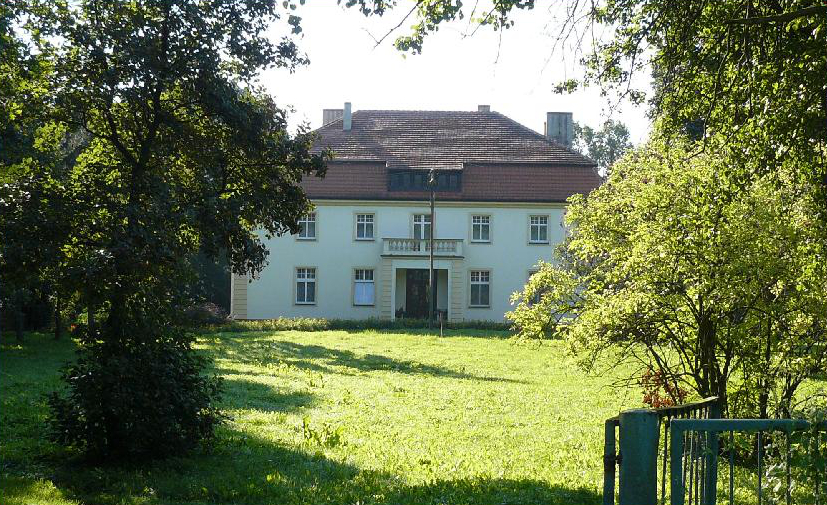

- Location within Poland

General information
- Type: Manor house
- Location: Chocicza Wielka, Poland
- Coordinates: 52°16′26.05″N 17°29′41.83″E

Mansion in Chocicza Wielka is a manor house from the turn of the nineteenth and twentieth century, situated in the village Chocicza Wielka in Wielkopolska province, in the district of Września, in the municipality of Wrzesnia. The manor was built for the German von Jouanne'ów family.

== Description ==
The mansion was built on a high basement and has one storey. The living space is located in the mansard roof. From the garden on the facade built one above the other semicircular balconies from which the bottom is wider. From both sides of the long facades are high projections, with the front projection divided by pilasters. The surrounding park was added during the construction of the manor.

== History ==
The manor was built at the turn of the nineteenth and twentieth centuries, and its owner in 1930 was Maximilian von Jouanna. Four years previously assets counted 1,540 hectares, and on the property are a brick factory and distillery.

== Gallery ==
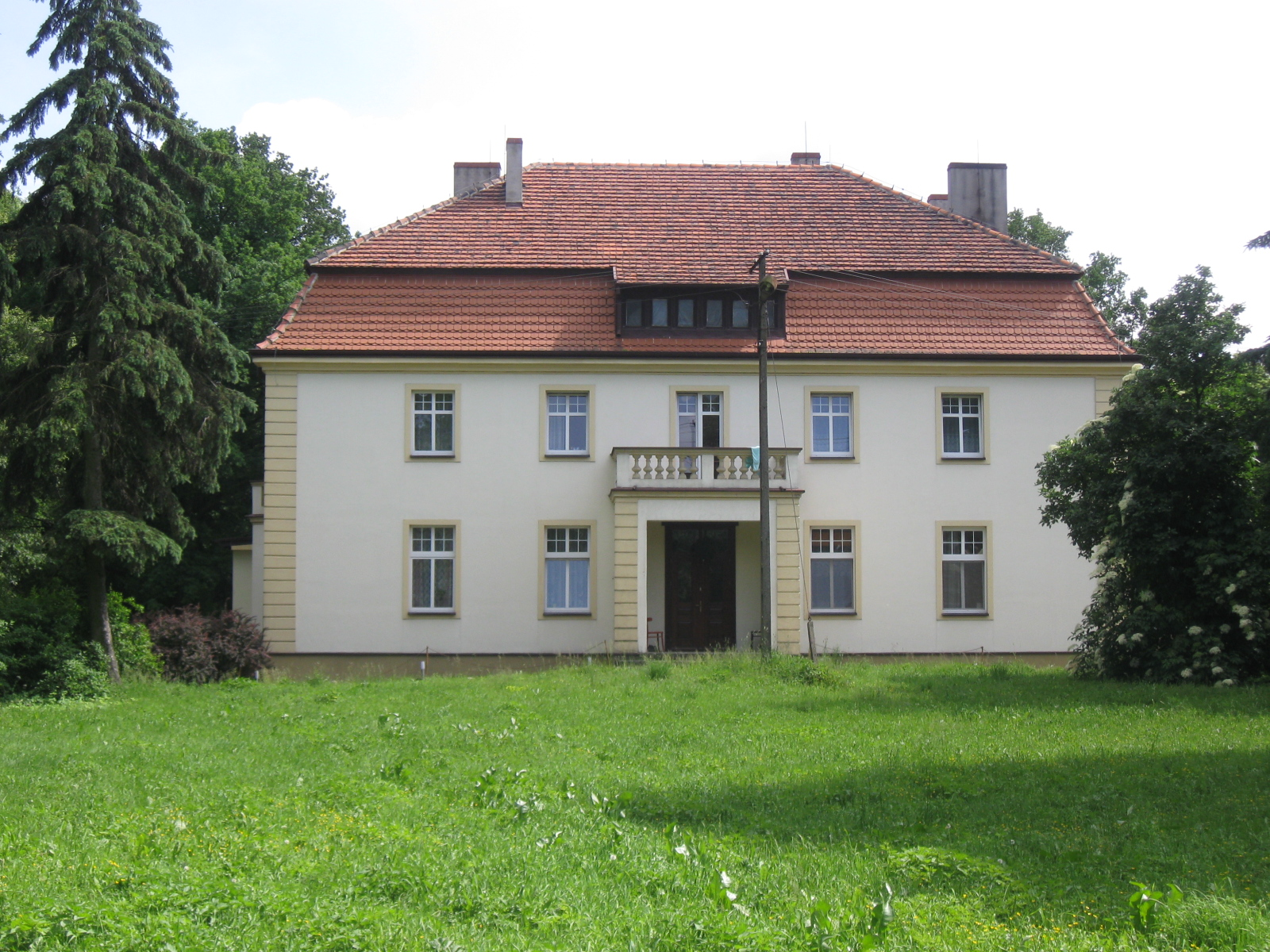
Manor house in Chocicza Wielka - Front side

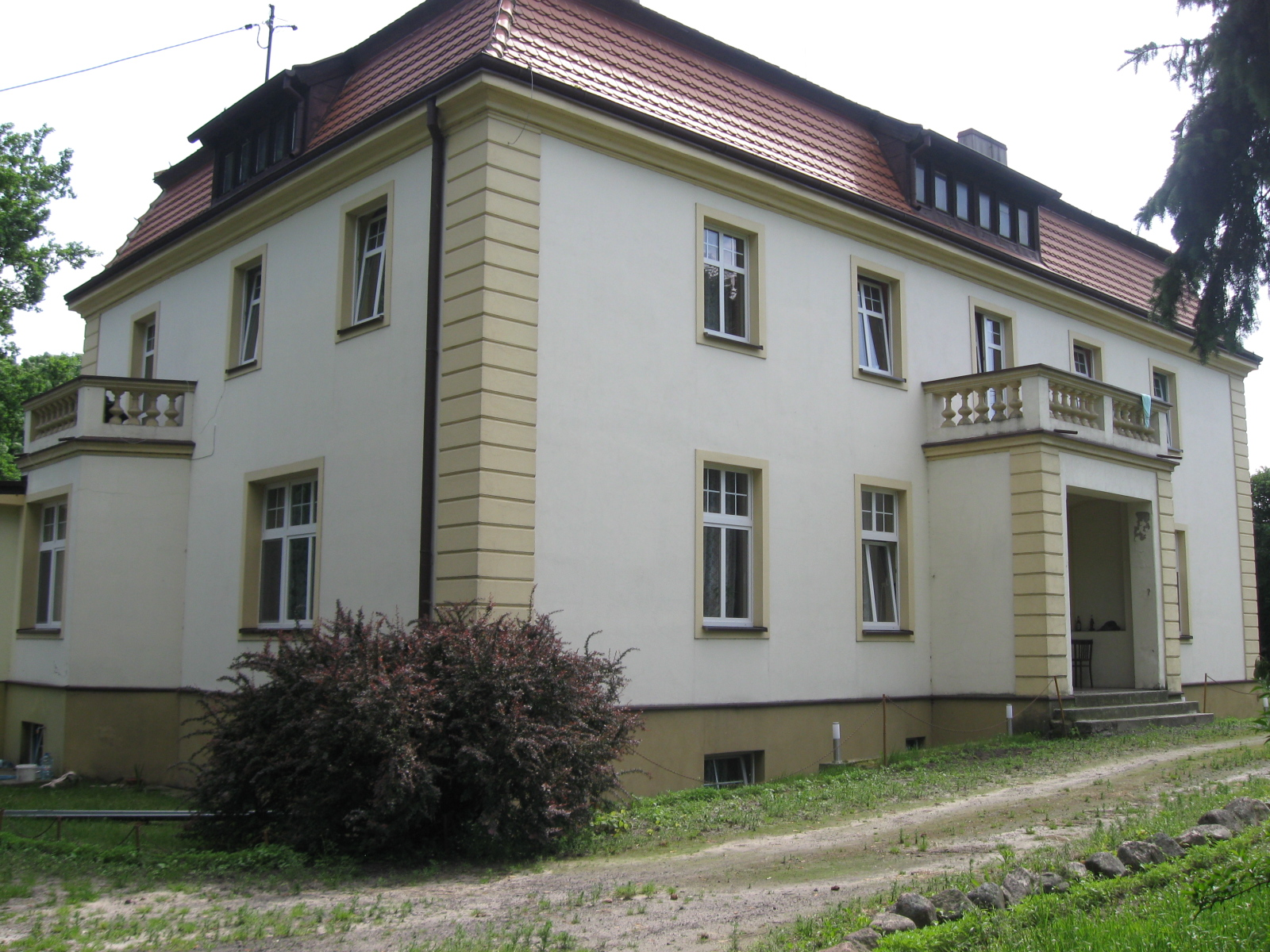
Manor house in Chocicza Wielka - Front and left side

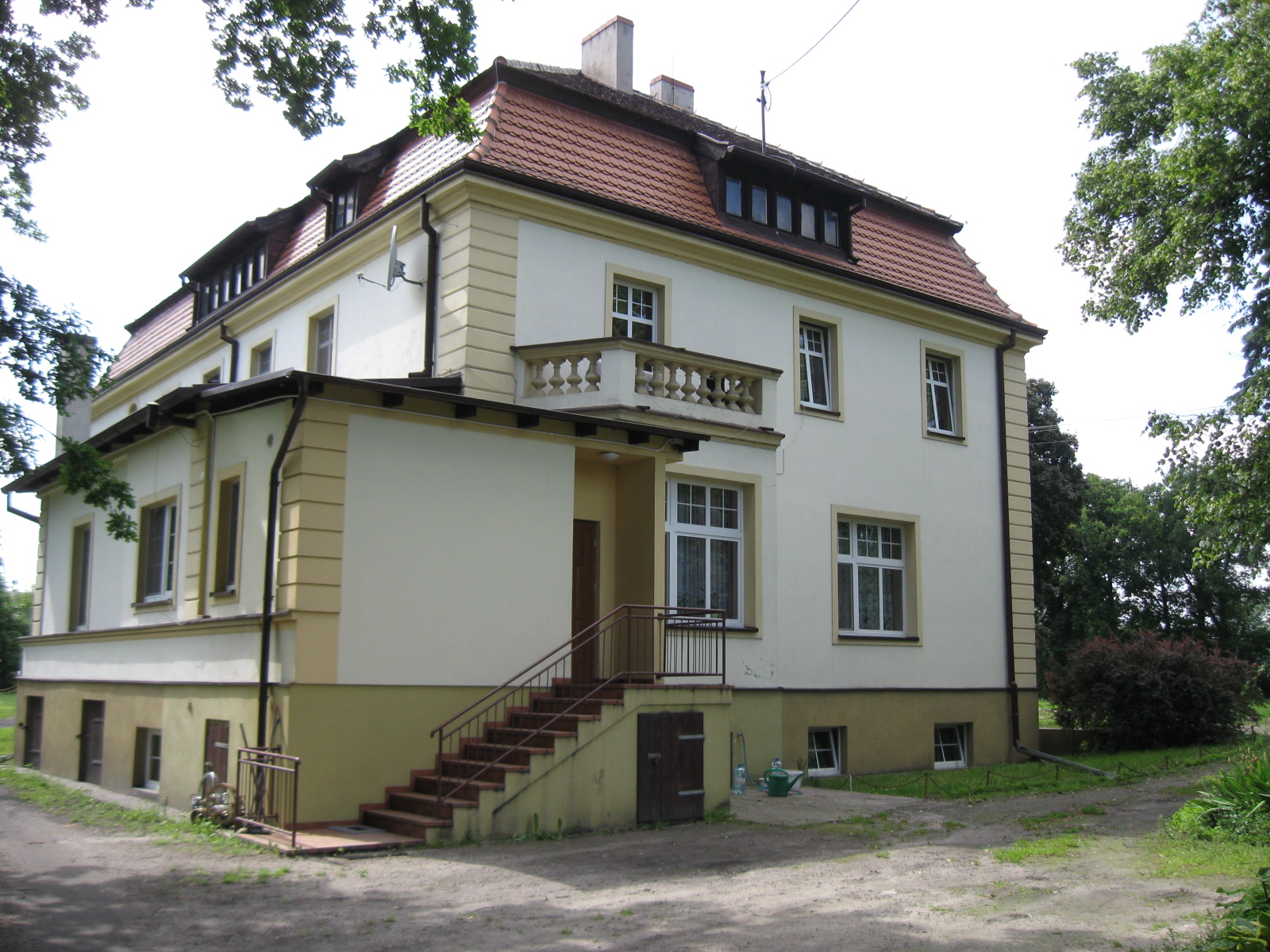
Manor house in Chocicza Wielka - Left side

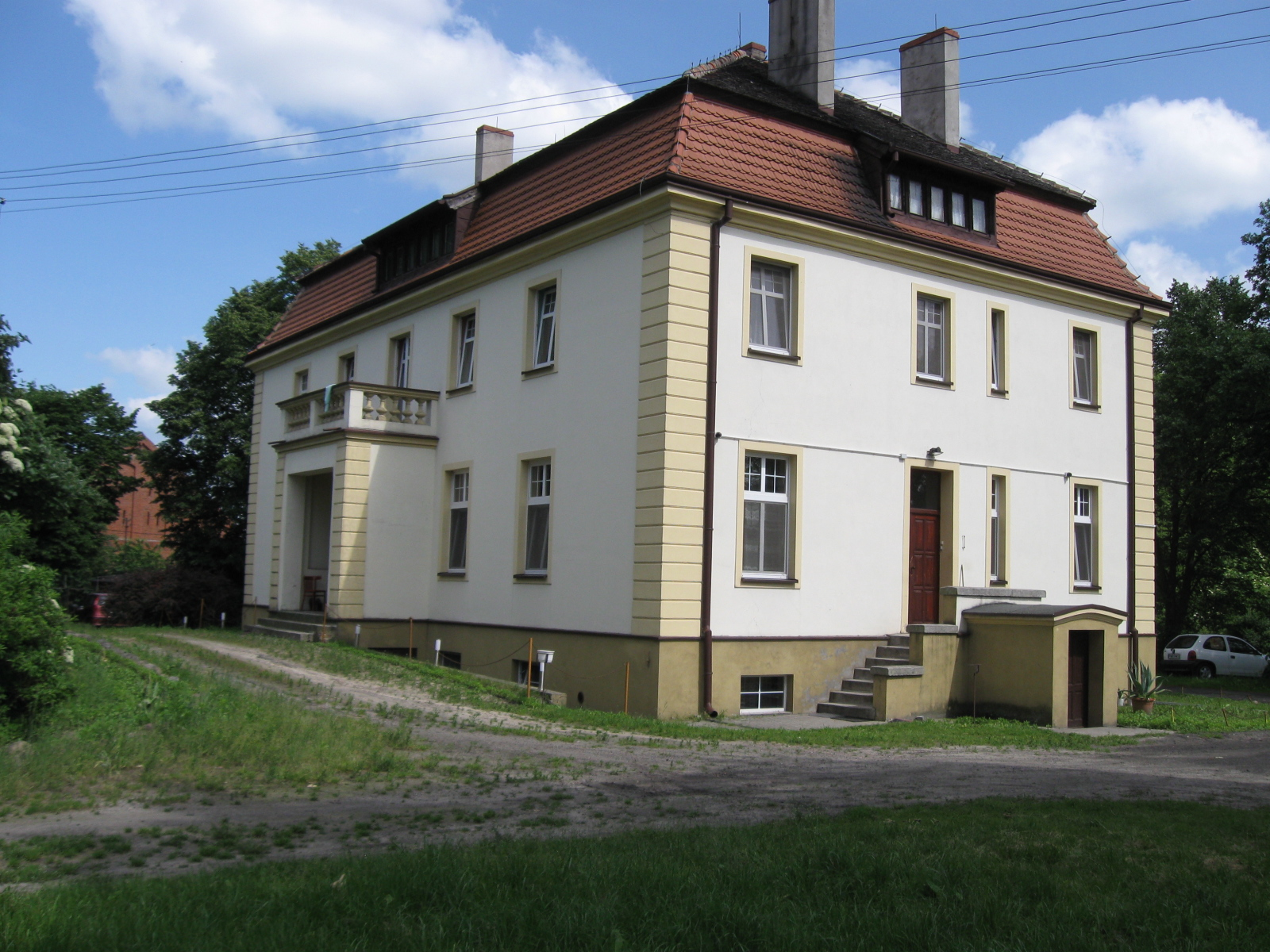
Manor house in Chocicza Wielka - right side

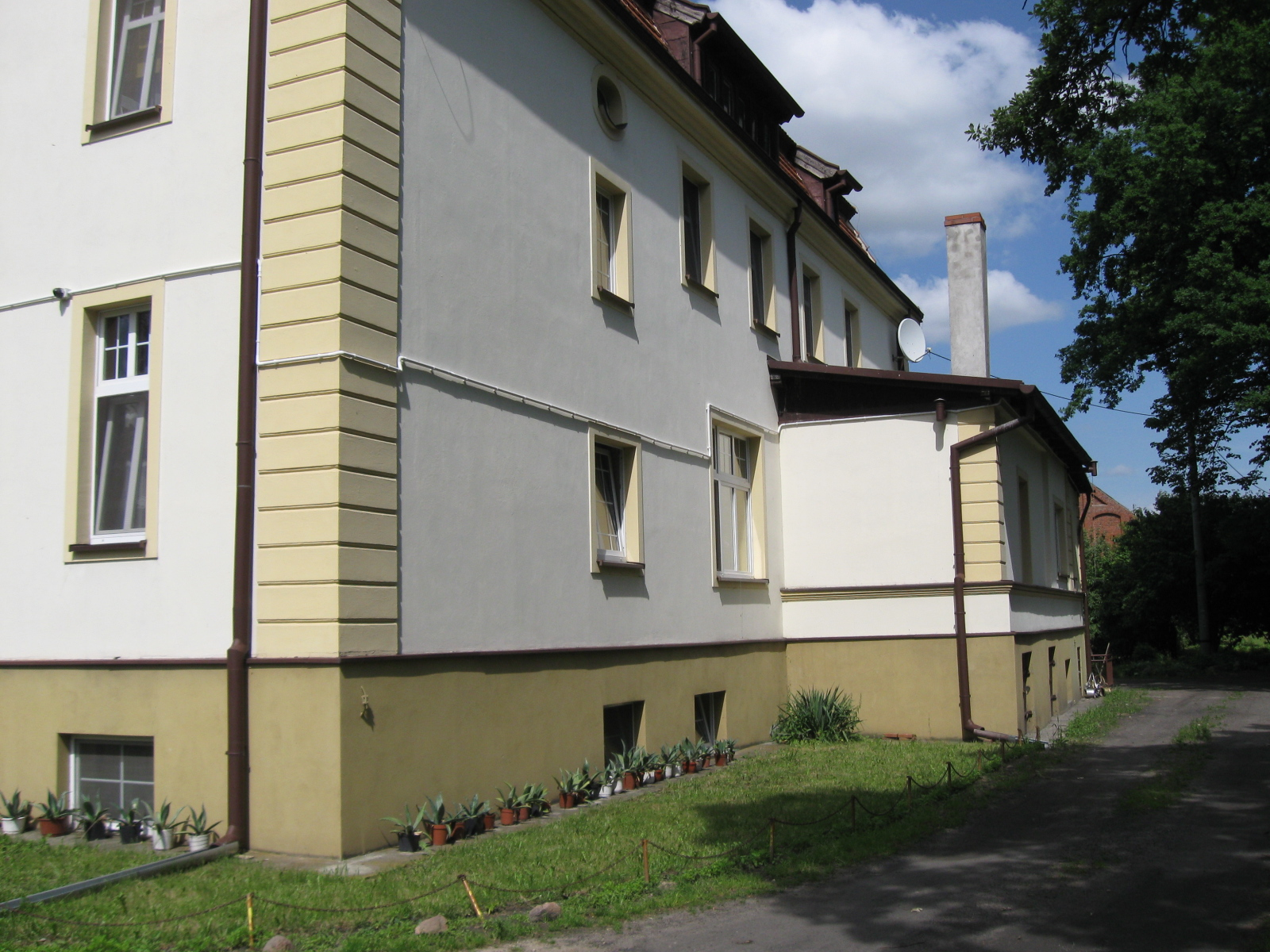
Manor house in Chocicza Wielka - back side
