= Chocicza Wielka =

- Village
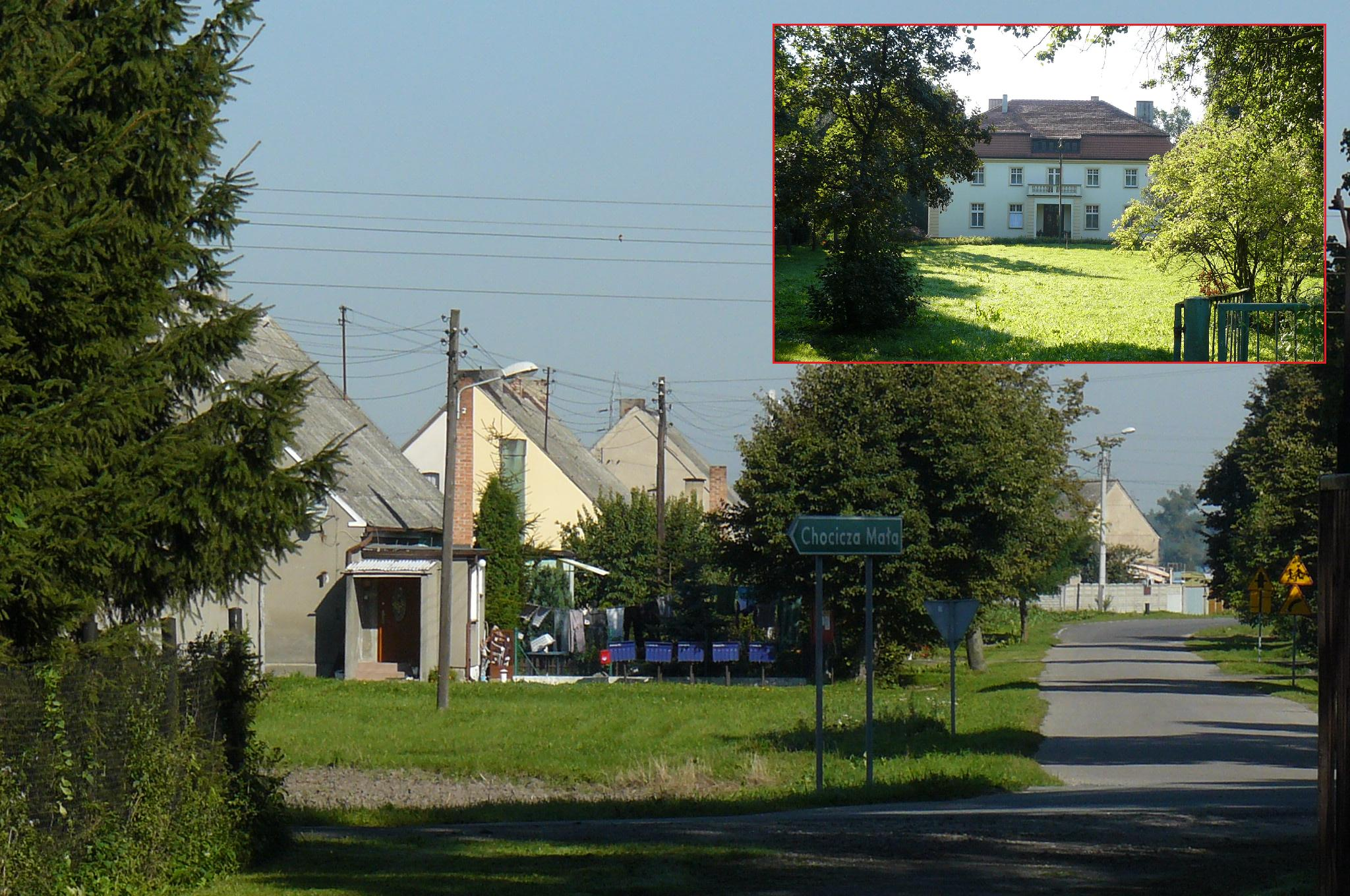
- Manor in Chocicza

- Location within Poland
- Coordinates: 52°18′48″N 17°30′52″E
- Country: Poland
- Voivodeship: Greater Poland
- County: Września
- Gmina: Września

Chocicza Wielka [xɔˈt͡ɕit͡ʂa ˈvjɛlka] is a village in the administrative district of Gmina Września, within Września County, Greater Poland Voivodeship, in west-central Poland.

== See also ==
- Manor house in Chocicza Wielka
