= Kaczanowo =

- Village
- Location within Poland
- Coordinates: 52°17′24″N 17°34′52″E
- Country: Poland
- Voivodeship: Greater Poland
- County: Września
- Gmina: Września

Kaczanowo [kat͡ʂaˈnɔvɔ] is a village in the administrative district of Gmina Września, within Września County, Greater Poland Voivodeship, in west-central Poland.
