= Palaces and park ensemble in Ostromecko =

Palace, Poland, 18th century

Coordinates: 53°04′56″N 18°12′22″E

- Zespół pałacowo-parkowy w Ostromecku
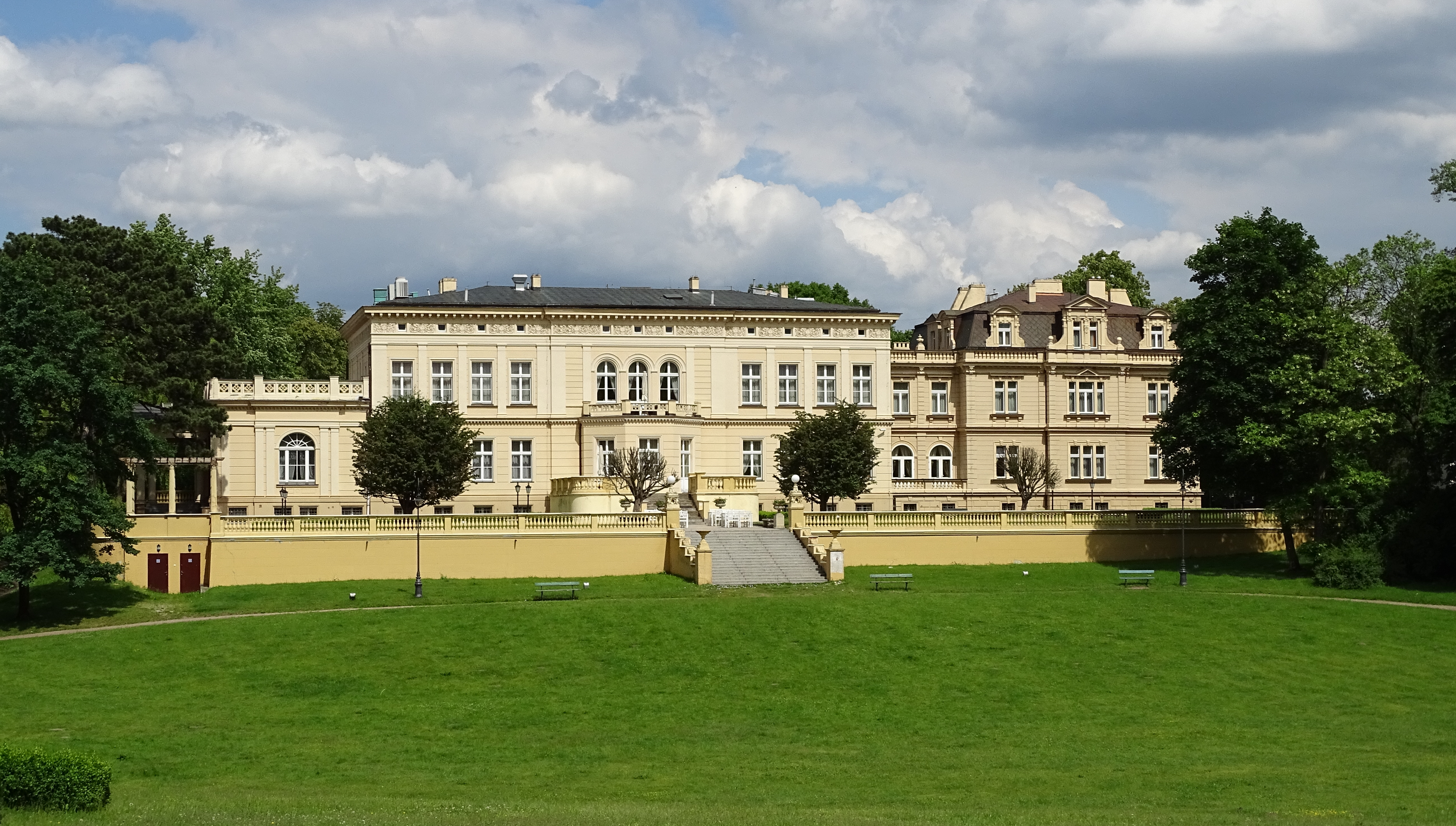
- The New Palace Ostromecko palaces (Poland) Ostromecko palaces (Kuyavian-Pomeranian Voivodeship)
- Former names: Mostowski Palace
- Alternative names: Hunter's Palace

General information
- Type: Palaces
- Architectural style: Neoclassical architecture, Rococo
- Classification: Kuyavian-Pomeranian Voivodeship Heritage List Nr.601103, 326 (December 19, 1955) and A/256/1-3 (April 24, 1991)
- Location: Ostromecko, Poland, Ul. Bydgoska 9, 86-070
- Current tenants: City of Bydgoszcz
- Construction started: 1759
- Inaugurated: 1766

Technical details
- Size: 712 square metres (7,660 sq ft) (old palace), 2,581 square metres (27,780 sq ft) (new palace)

Design and construction
- Known for: Piano Collection

Website
- http://palacwostromecku.pl/

The Palaces and park complex in Ostromecko is a residential complex, including two palaces and a park, located in Ostromecko, Kuyavian–Pomeranian Voivodeship, Poland. It has been owned since 1996 by the city of Bydgoszcz. The ensemble is a regional cultural and recreational centre. It is notable for its rococo and neoclassical architecture, its history, and its art collections, including a significant collection of historic pianos.

== Location ==
The complex of palaces and park of Ostromecko is located in a suburban village of Bydgoszcz, in Kujawsko-Pomorskie Voivodeship, Poland. The ensemble sits on a slope of the Vistula, 3 kilometres (1.9 mi) east of Fordon and 16 kilometres (9.9 mi) from the city centre of Bydgoszcz.

== Characteristics ==
The facility consists of a 38 hectares (0.15 sq mi) park, centered on two palaces. The smaller Old Palace, aka the Mostowski Palace, is a baroque palace that dates back to the mid-18th century. Its windows and terrace overlook the Vistula valley and the Wielka Kępa nature reserve.

The larger one, the New Palace or the Schönborn Palace, is a Neoclassical architecture residence built between 1832 and 1848. The building was enlarged at the end of the 19th century with a two-story wing, a ballroom, and viewing terraces, combining Neo-Renaissance and Neo-Baroque styles.

The area is surrounded by an English garden. At the bottom of the Old Palace lies one of the few examples of an Italian Renaissance garden in Poland. Both the park and the palaces have been included on the Kuyavian-Pomeranian monuments Heritage list. The Old Palace and the park were added in 1955, and the New Palace was added in 1991. The park is also on the List of parks and historic gardens in Poland.

The property belongs to the commune of Bydgoszcz. It is managed by the city's Municipal Cultural Center. The complex is regularly used for a variety of events: concerts, theater performances, art exhibitions, vernissages, conferences, meetings, banquets and symposiums. The Ostromecko Complex comprises a 22-room hotel, a restaurant (Pałacowa), and conference rooms. The Old Palace also houses a piano museum and the park hosts regularly outdoor events and historical reconstructions. During weekends, a summer cafe is open on the terrace. In the New Palace, different spaces are available for organizing events: ballroom (for 200 people, connected to the terrace); gold room (90 seats, connected to the terrace); green room (80 seats, with a view upon the English garden); fireplace (50 seats); pistachio room (35 seats, view upon the English garden); Italian salon (10 seats, with a balcony).

=== Old Palace ===
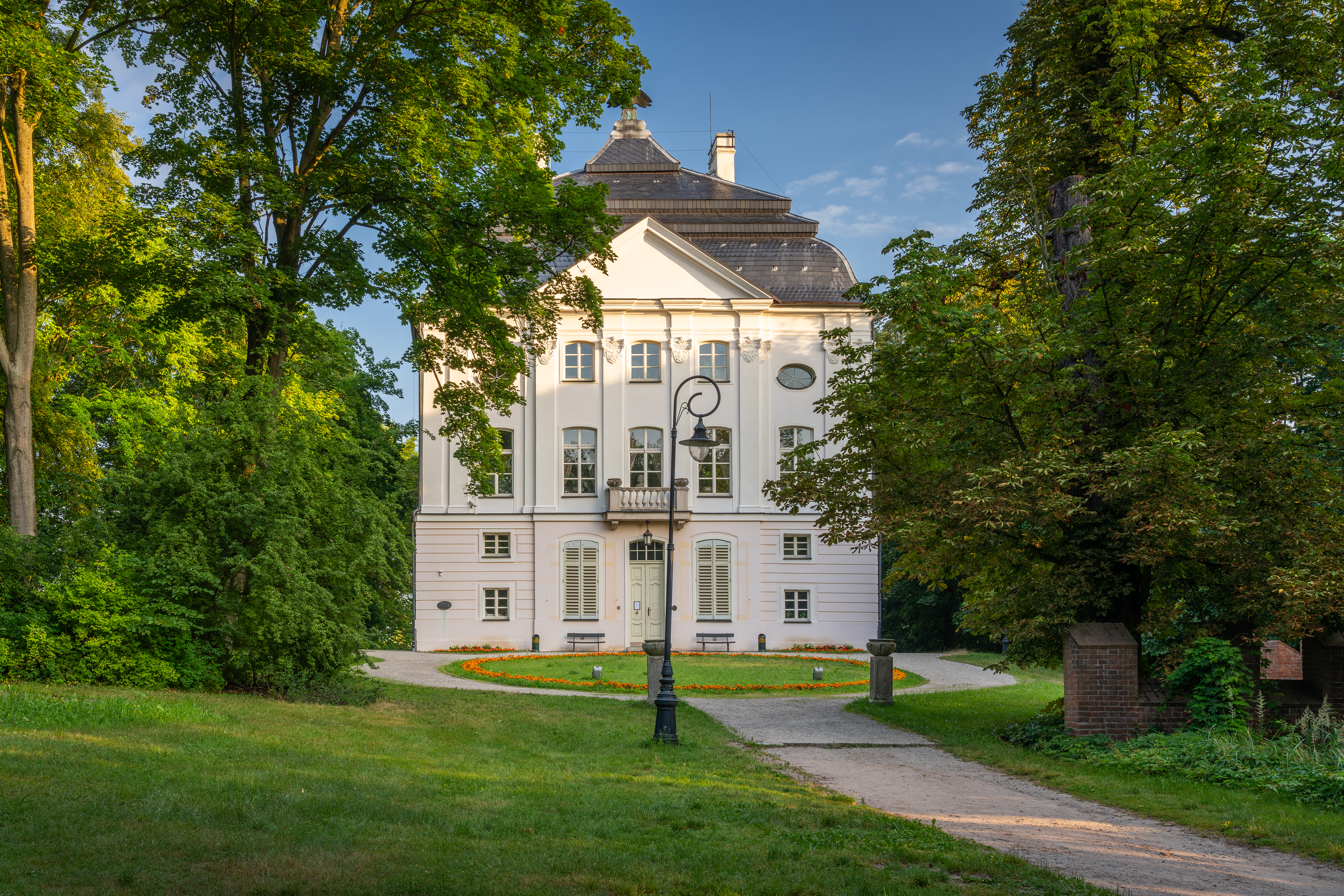
View of the Old Palace

The Old Palace, also known as the Mostowski Palace, stands on the edge of the plateau overlooking the Vistula valley, where a noble manor house once stood. There used to be picnics at the end of hunting parties in this place, hence its second nickname, the Hunter's Palace. Fragments from the original mansion (17th century) are still preserved, such as the stone wall strengthening the palace on the ravine side of the hill and the semicircular corner tower. The two-story baroque mansion with Saxon Rococo elements was built in 1759-1766 by Paweł Michał Mostowski (1721-1766), general-lieutenant of the army of the Crown(1758) and Voivode (1758-1766) who was part of the Bar Confederation.

The square brick building has three stories with a mezzanine, an unused attic and an area of 712.5 square metres (7,669 sq ft). The basement has a stone barrel vault ceiling. The façades are adorned with columns, pilasters, and stuccoed windows. The northern façade offers an observation deck with a view over the Italian garden, reaching all the way down to the Vistula valley. The front façade displays a small stone balcony over the entrance and an avant-corps framed by two pairs of pilasters, topped with a triangular pediment. The Mansard roof, covered with slate tiles, is crowned with a Piast Eagle sculpture. The interiors house fragments of stucco decorations and an openwork balustrade in the hall. Since 2000, the palace has hosted the Andrzej Szwalbe collection of Historic Pianos.

=== New Palace ===
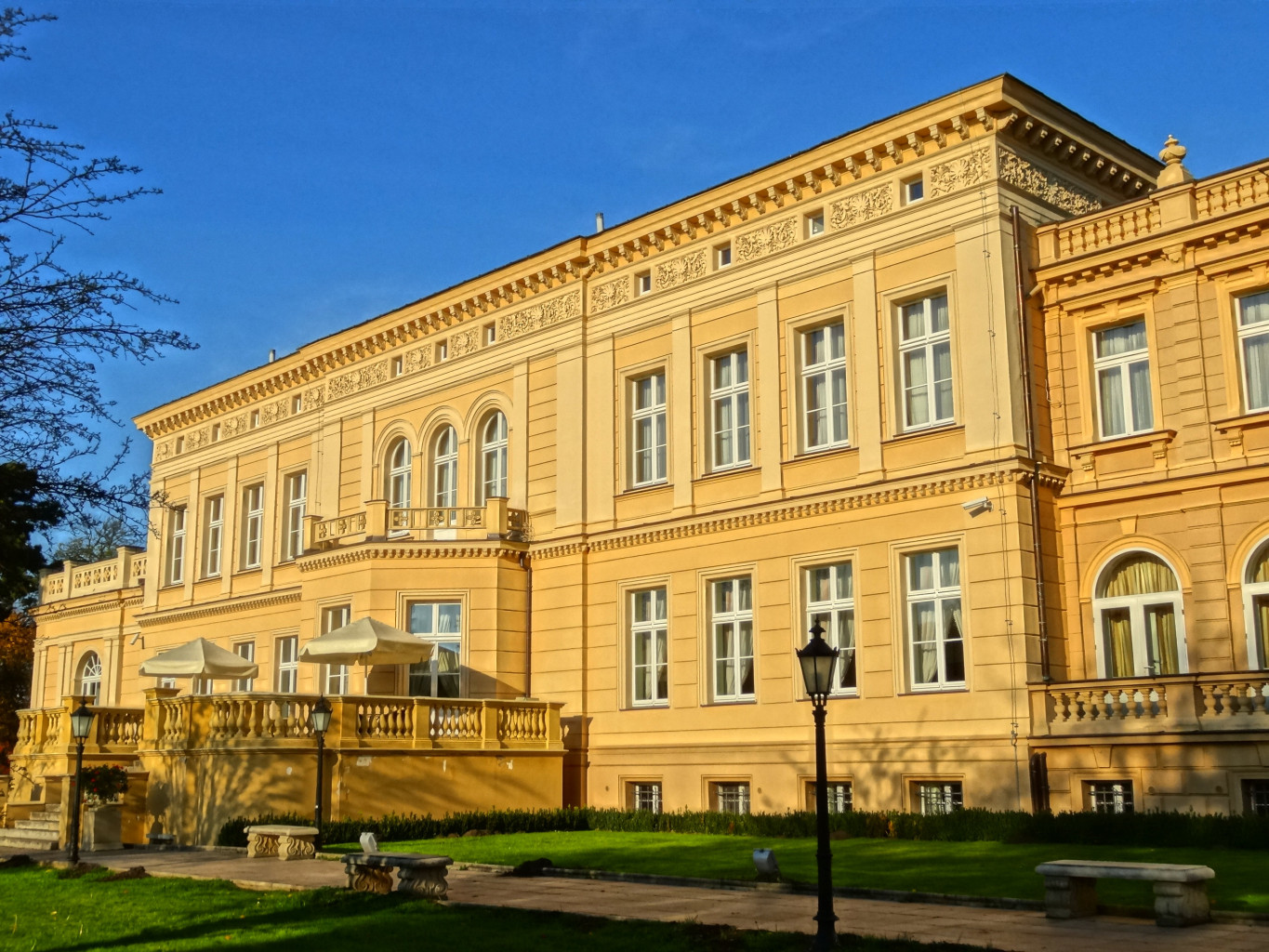
New Palace - main frontage

The New Palace, which faces the main entrance to the Palace and Park ensemble, is located in the eastern part of the park. The New Palace was originally neoclassical, but eclectic features were added later. The main body is rectangular, with a slight avant-corps at the front and a rear façade closed by a terrace. The palace is two stories high with a basement, and its gable has a low hip roof. A neo-baroque, two-level hunting mansion with a mansard roof chapel was added to the south, connected to the palace with a two-story gallery. The ballroom is on the northern side of the New Palace.

The interiors feature well-preserved original stucco decorations. A series of terraces ornament the New Palace on the side facing the park, penned by a retaining wall with a balustrade. Pergolas with Corinthian and Tuscan style columns decorate the northwestern and southern ends of the park. The New Palace, which is significantly larger than its older neighbour, has a building footprint of 2,581.4 square metres (27,786 sq ft).

=== Park ===
The 38 hectares (0.15 sq mi) park in Ostromecko surrounds both palaces and partially covers the edge of the Vistula valley. It consists of two distinctive sections, one of which is Italian in style and the other is English.

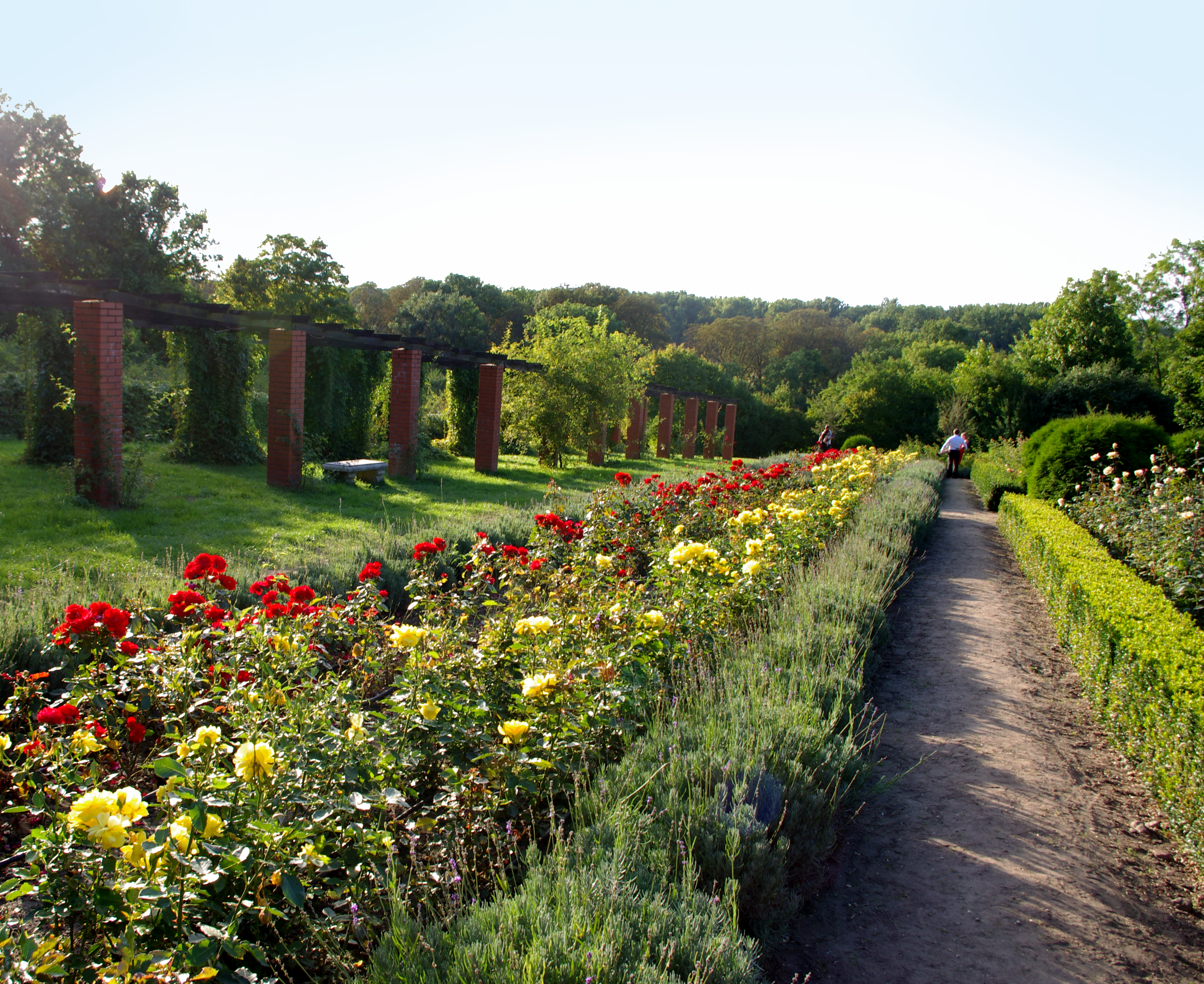
View of the Italian Garden

The Italian garden, which was created at the beginning of the 18th century around the Mostowski Palace, stretches over three terraces down to the Vistula River. Stairs provide access to each level. A chestnut alley connects to the Italian garden from the south. From the north, a hornbeam path leads to three terrace gardens descending with steps towards the escarpment. At the bottom stretches a four-row alley of linden trees ending with an oval pool which was once fed by a fountain. Pattern-plot plantings are present on either side of the walkway.

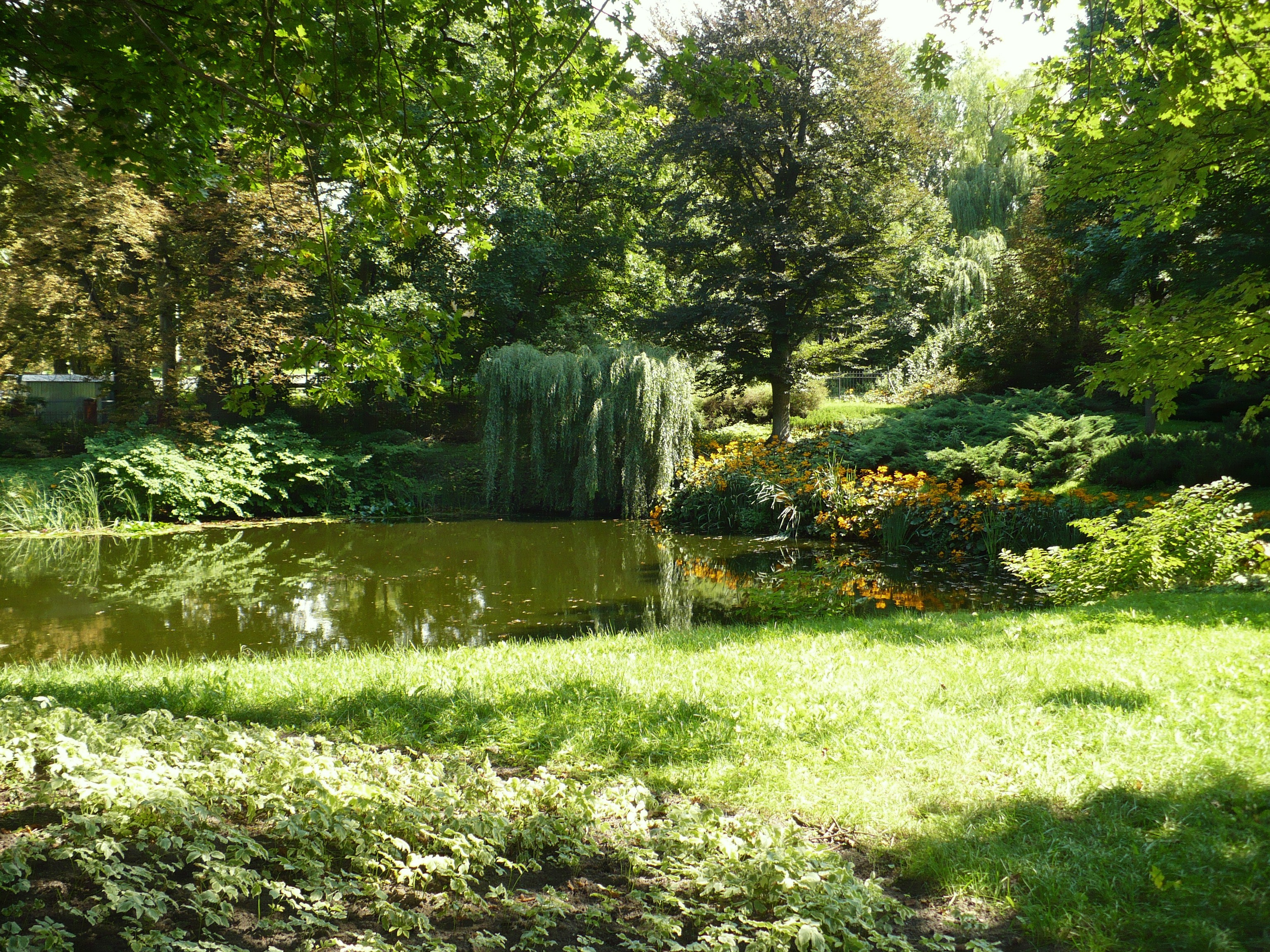
The English Garden

The English garden is near the New Palace: it was created in the 1830s by Peter Joseph Lenné, a renowned Prussian royal gardener, who also assisted in creating the gardens of Sanssouci Park in Potsdam. It consists of a garden and a forested area, using the natural assets of the terrain. Much of the layout is made up of lawn clearings with picturesque terrain and trees. The distinctive look of the English garden relies heavily on monumental trees, relics of the Vistula oak-hornbeam forest, mainly little-leaf lindens and English oaks. These trees serve the dual purpose of defining the viewing perspective in front of the palace terrace and contributing to the overall look of the landscape together with lanes and ponds. It is complemented by a primeval forest set into the park. Clusters of oak-hornbeam dominate here, as well as enclaves of riparian woodland and alder carrs. A natural network that runs throughout the entire complex irrigates the whole system of gardens: it consists mainly a stream and four ponds called Kluczyki, encircled by lawns, shrubs, perennials and aquatic plants.

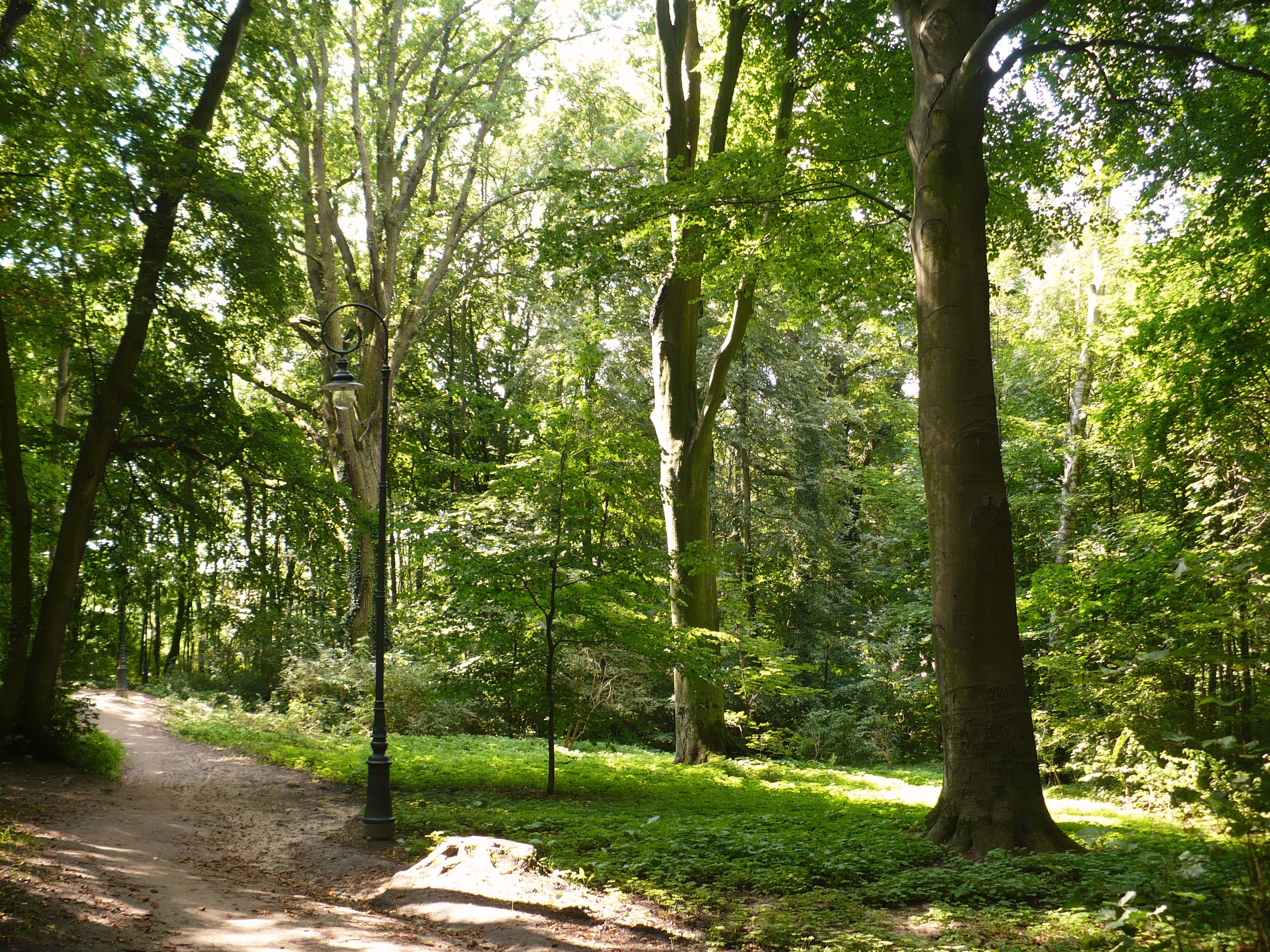
Forest area

The park's trees vary widely in terms of both species and age. The most abundant varieties areash, horse chestnut, little-leaf linden, English oak, Norway spruce, Norway maple, and field maple.

An inventory from the 1990s lists 850 deciduous trees and roughly 180 conifers . Because of the exceptional age and diversity of the tree collection, several Natural monuments are registered there, including11 lindens, 17 English oaks, 26 horse chestnuts, 4 common beeches, 1 Norway maple, 1 white pine, 6 European white elms, 2 Cornish oaks and 1 black alder,

In the depths of the park also stands the neo-Romanesque mausoleum of the Schönborn and Alvensleben families. Both a pheasantry and a refuge for deer were present in the park. Orchards also grew near the Old palace; today, only relics (mainly crabapples and pears) can be found. In 2009, the Ostromecko Park was ranked second in a competition for the most beautiful park in Poland, organized by the company Briggs & Stratton. A comprehensive restoration of the complex (buildings and park) was completed in 2018.

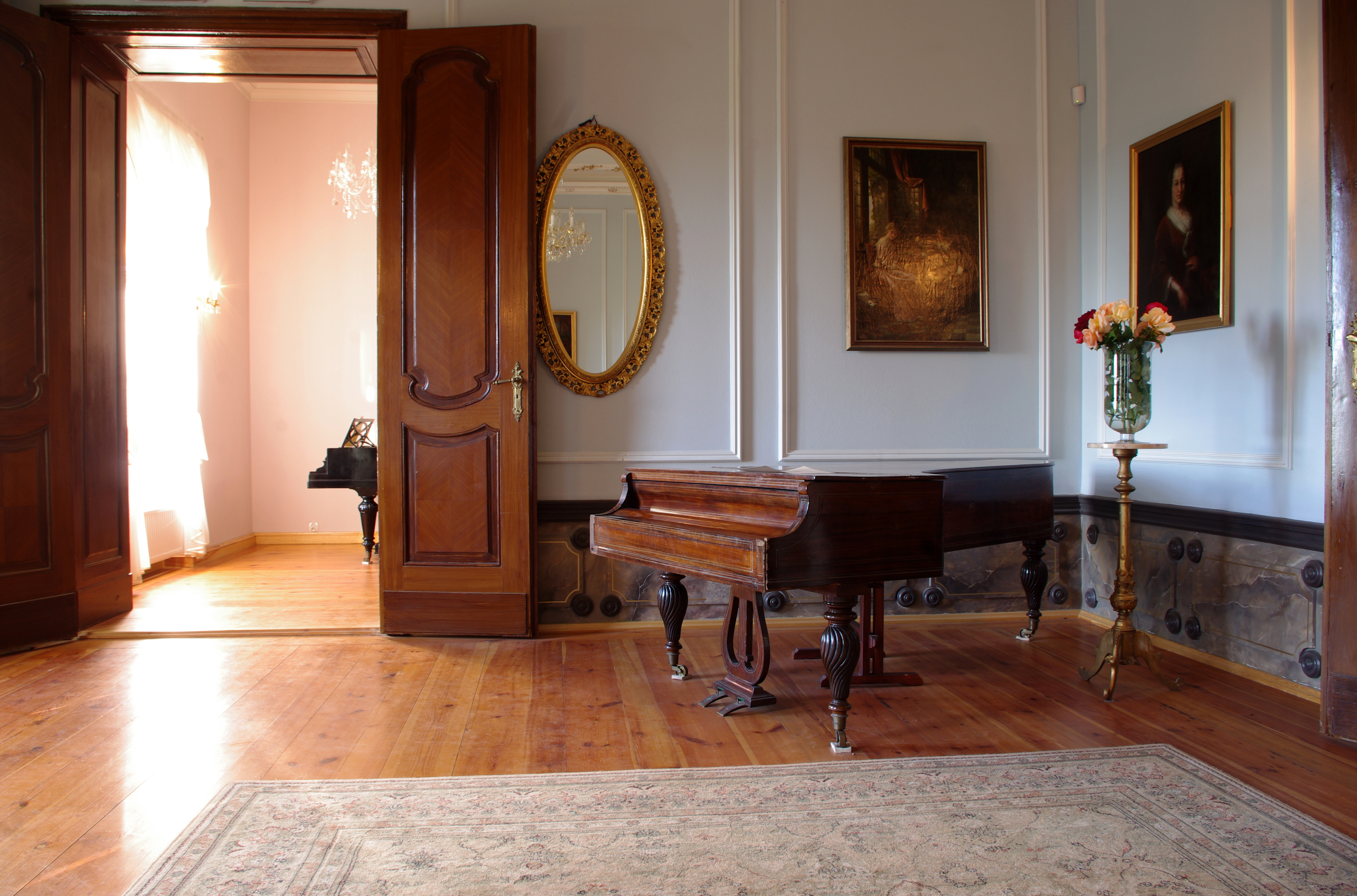
Piano collection in the Old Palace

=== Andrzej Szwalbe Collection of historic pianos ===
Andrzej Szwalbe, a former director of the Pomeranian Philharmonic, created a collection of historic pianos in 1978. For many years, pianos were stored in the premises of the Pomeranian Philharmonic; but since 2000, the collection has been exhibited at the Old Palace. The collection includes wing pianos, table pianos, mixed pianos and other instruments, manufactured in the 19th century in Poland, Europe and United States.

In 2016, the Bydgoszcz Municipal Cultural Centre published a bilingual (Polish-English) catalog of the exhibition. Entitled "Andrzej Szwalbe Collection of Historic Pianos", it was written by Benjamin Vogel.

== History ==
=== Early period (13th-18th centuries) ===
The Old Palace was built on the site of a former knight's court, itself built during the 13th century. The name Ostromezk, that is, Ostromecko, appeared for the first time in 1222 in a document signed by Duke Konrad of Mazovia. Duke Konrad invited the Teutonic Order to assist him in his fight against the pagan Prussian tribes, resulting in Ostromecko being placed under the ownership of Teutonic knights from 1231 to 1475, ending a few years after the Second Peace of Toruń in 1466.

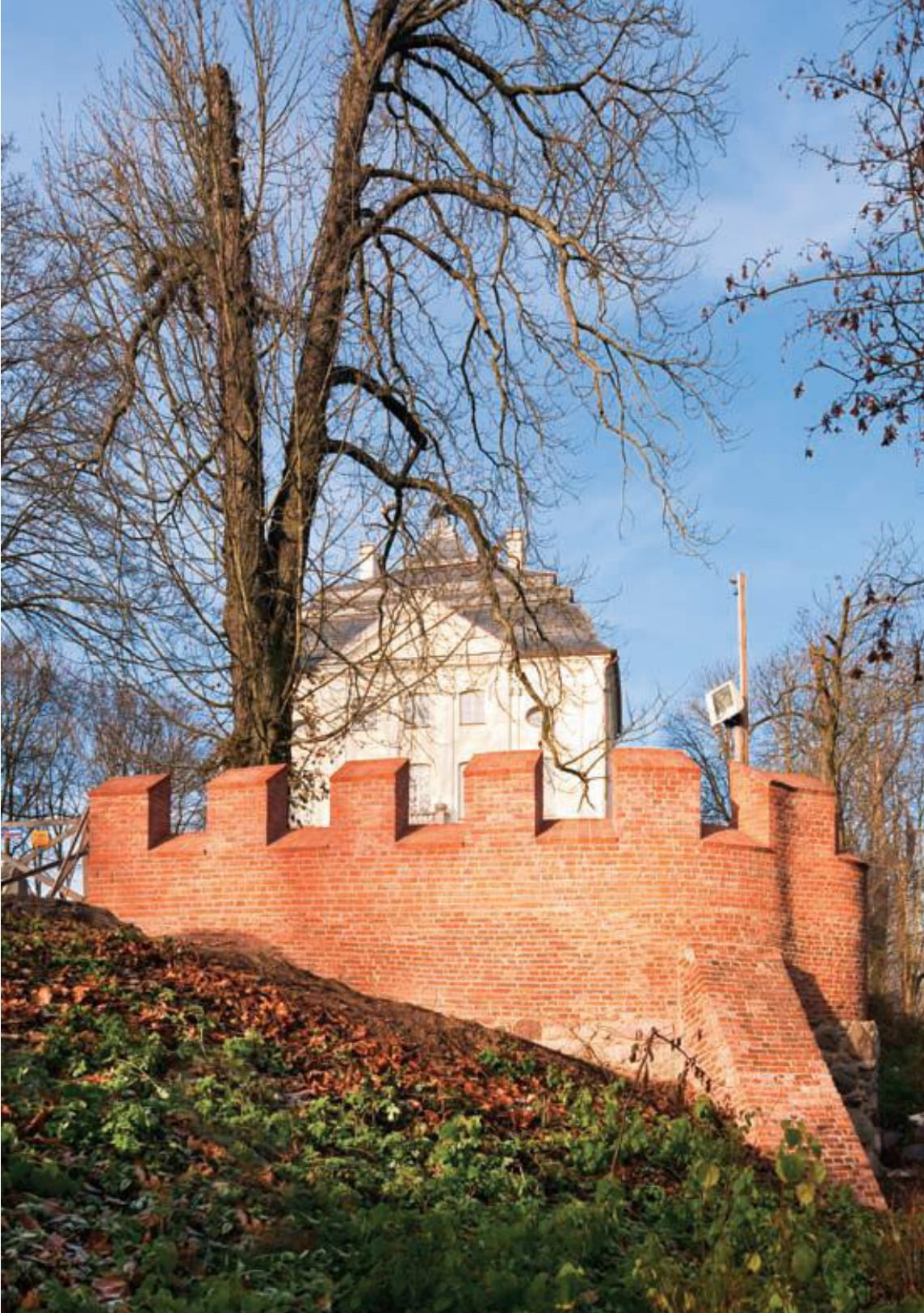
Fragments of the wall by the Old Palace - 17th century

At the end of the Teutonic period, the manor house was owned by the Ostromęcki family from Pomian nobility. They later changed their name to Ostromecki. The family administered the neighbouring domains, with three family members each assuming control of a separate domain:

- Jakub Ostromecki at Ostromecko;
- Szymon Ostromecki at Izbice and Reptowo;
- Jan Ostromecki in Pawłowice.

Some of the Ostromecki family members became servants at the royal court. One of them, Bartolomaeus Ostromecki, hetman and standard-bearer from Chełmno, was offered the village of Adsel (now Gaujiena) and the territory of Ruinen (today Rūjiena) in historical Livonia in 1585, by king Stephen Báthory, for his meritorious services. The Ostromęcki family also owned folwarks and Nowy Dwór estate, connected to Ostromecko, with land, windmills, craft workshops and livestock (sheep).

In 1624, after his marriage with Gertruda Ostromecka, Jakub's sister, Jan Dorpowski, a nobleman from Leliwa descent, took over the Ostromecko estates. He had a modest manor built and land plots scattered along the Vistula valley leased to Mennonite Olędrzy: Strzyżawa, Mała Kępa, Wielka Kępa, Rafa and Mozgowina. Around 1680, Katarzyna Dorpowska Leliwa married Paweł Mostowski from the Dołęga family, a chamberlain of Płock. Their only son, Bogdan Teodor Mostowski Dołęga, was castellan of Sierpc, Racia, Płock and took part to the Tarnogród Confederation. He inherited Ostromecko from his mother and Mostowo, Kuczbork-Osada in the Płock Voivodeship from his father. Bogdan wedded Ludwika Kruszyńska, from the castellan of Gdańsk. On May 27, 1708, the manor was entirely burned down as a consequence of the ongoing Great Northern War, and the property plundered by a unit of Swedish dragoons from the regiment led by Colonel Charles G. von Marschalck. In 1715, Jakub Dorpowski died and the manor changed hands, for the benefit of the Mostowski's.

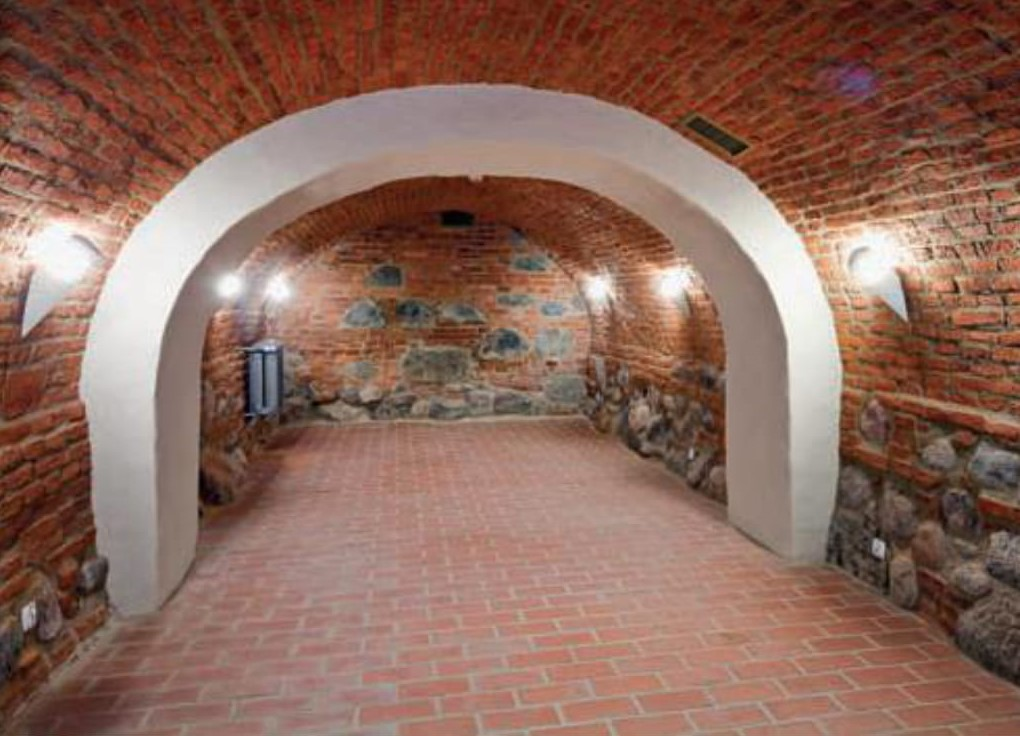
Old Palace - cellar

Bogdan Teodor Mostowski had a new house built, as depicted on the Ostromecko panorama realized in 1738–1744 by Georg Friedrich Steiner: it was a one-story brick mansion with eight rooms and three cellars, surrounded by an Italian garden. The village comprised a farm with granaries, stables, a sheepfold, fish ponds, wind and watermill, a brewery, a distillery, a brickyard and an inn. At that time, the Ostromęcki estate included the following folwarks: Ostromecko, Izbica (now Nowy Dwór), Reptowo and the Olędrzy leased lands. In 1748, the estates of Ostromec and Masovia were bequeathed to Paweł Michał Mostowski Dołęga (1721–1781), voivode of Pomerania (1758–1763) and known for his ambitious and lavish life. Paweł Mostowski's career was supported by the Czartoryski family and Heinrich von Brühl, an influent Polish-Saxon statesman who helped him get the voivodship head and the Order of the White Eagle. In the 1750s, the modest noble residence in Ostromecko gave place to a Dresden-like baroque palace, which is today the Old Palace. Paweł strived to convert the village into a town, stimulating local economy by settling Jewish families in Ostromecko.

Under Paweł Mostowski's rule, the village experienced an unprecedented development. Hence, thanks to his close links with the royal court:

- Ostromecko was raised to the status of town on August 25, 1750, by decision of king Augustus III;
- a monaster of the Pauline fathers was set up in Ostromecko in 1767.

Due to the social and political turmoil of the period, both decisions were declared invalid. Concurrently, the extravagant lifestyle of Paweł Mostowski caused his estate to be indebted and under sequestration. Eventually, king Stanisław August Poniatowski moved Mostowski to the position of voivode of Masovia in 1763, then expelled him from the country in 1768 for his participation to the Bar Confederation.

=== Prussian partition ===
After the First Partition of Poland in 1772, Ostromecko was incorporated into the Kingdom of Prussia. Prussian authorities put up Ostromecki property for auction. In October 1794, during the Kościuszko Uprising, a unit of the Polish insurgent army under command of general Michał Sokolnicki, sent by general Dąbrowski, resided in the Old Palace. Dąbrowski was on his way from Bydgoszcz to the area of Chełmno. After the defeat of Maciejowice, the insurgent army left and moved to Warsaw.

Under Prussian rule, the estate changed owners every few years, being a subject of land speculation:

- Voigt in 1776;
- Freiherr Karl von Birkhan, a Prussian officer in 1780;
- Karl Friedrich Goldbeck, a German privy counsellor in 1797.

In 1804, the domain was bought by the Schönborns from Grudziądz, a rich merchant family dealing with grain business. Initially, they managed the estate while still living in Grudziądz: from 1806 to 1808, the palace underwent a renovation, including rebuilding the roof. In October 1806, the Palace hosted the Prussian royal couple, Frederick William III and his wife Louise, who left Berlin to East Prussia to escape Napoleon's troops.

At the beginning of 1807, French troops arrived to Ostromecko. The Prussian administration was removed and the town was administrated by the Bydgoszcz Department of the Duchy of Warsaw. In addition, cavalry barracks were built in 1807–1810 in Nowy Dwór near Ostromecko, for the benefit of Polish squadron of the Duchy of Warsaw. Later, they were converted into apartments. In June 1812, Napoleon crossed the Vistula river near Ostromecko, heading for war to Russia. After the Congress of Vienna in 1815, Ostromecko and its surroundings were once again incorporated into the Kingdom of Prussia.

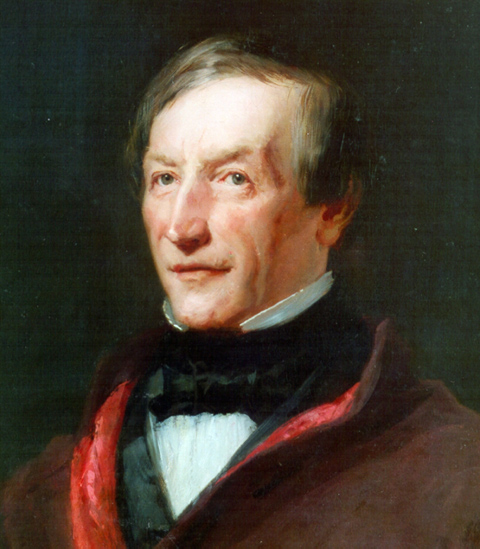
Portrait of P.J. Lenné

Jakub Marcin Schönborn, Ostromecko landlord and a successful entrepreneur, was ennobled in 1812, by decision of Frederick Augustus I of Saxony, then Duke of Warsaw. With the abolition of serfdom sanctioned by the Prussian legislation (1823–1850), the Schönborn administration transferred part of its land to the peasants and required the smallholders to work in the farm and in the nascent manor industry. In 1832, Jakub Schönborn commissioned the construction of a new residence, today's New Palace, designed by the Berlin architectural studio of Karl Friedrich Schinkel. At the same time, he developed the English-style landscape park drawn by Peter Joseph Lenné, a Prussian royal gardener. This new palace replaced an unfinished town hall that Paweł Mostowski started to erect in 1760.

Gottlieb Marcin Vertraugott von Schönborn (1826–1874), heir to the estate, transformed in 1844 the Ostromecko domain into a family property. A member of the Polish landed gentry, he invested in agricultural and processing production, construction and land afforestation. Furthermore, he kept on working on the New Palace, hiring Edward Toetz, a designer from Berlin, Artur Goebel, a construction manager, carpenter Kauffmann from Dolna Grupa and painter Arndt for visual settings Between 1858 and 1861, an Evangelical Church (Saint Paul) was erected in the vicinity of the New Palace: it has been demolished in 1957. In addition, the road from Strzyżawa to Dąbrowa Chełmińska was laid (1853–1856), allowing Gottlieb von Schönborn to modify its route so that his palace was visible from a distance.

In 1873, the Schönborn and Avensleben families united in Ostromecko when Marta Matylda Maria Schönborn (1854-1915) married Albrecht von Avensleben (1840–1928), from Saxony. Albrecht von Alvensleben was a member of the Order of Malta, cultivating the traditions of the Teutonic Order. When his father died in 1879, Albrecht took over the family estate in Erxleben, Saxony-Anhalt: he leased it after his union with Marta Matylda to dedicate his time to the management of Schönborn's domaines (including Ostromecko, Głuchowo, Cichoradz). From 1878 to 1887, he had a neo-Romanesque mausoleum built in the park, where today ten members of the Schönborn and Avensleben families are buried. In 1880, the Alvensleben family was officially listed as Lord of Ostromecko and in 1888, Albrecht received from the German emperor Frederick III the title of Count von Alvensleben-Schönborn. In 1891, Count Albrecht extended the New Palace with an eclectic hunting lodge, rebuilt the Old Palace and adorned the park by setting rows of trees, avenues and pergolas. Three years later, emperor Wilhelm II honored the domain by his presence, while officially opening the Fordon bridge across the Vistula.

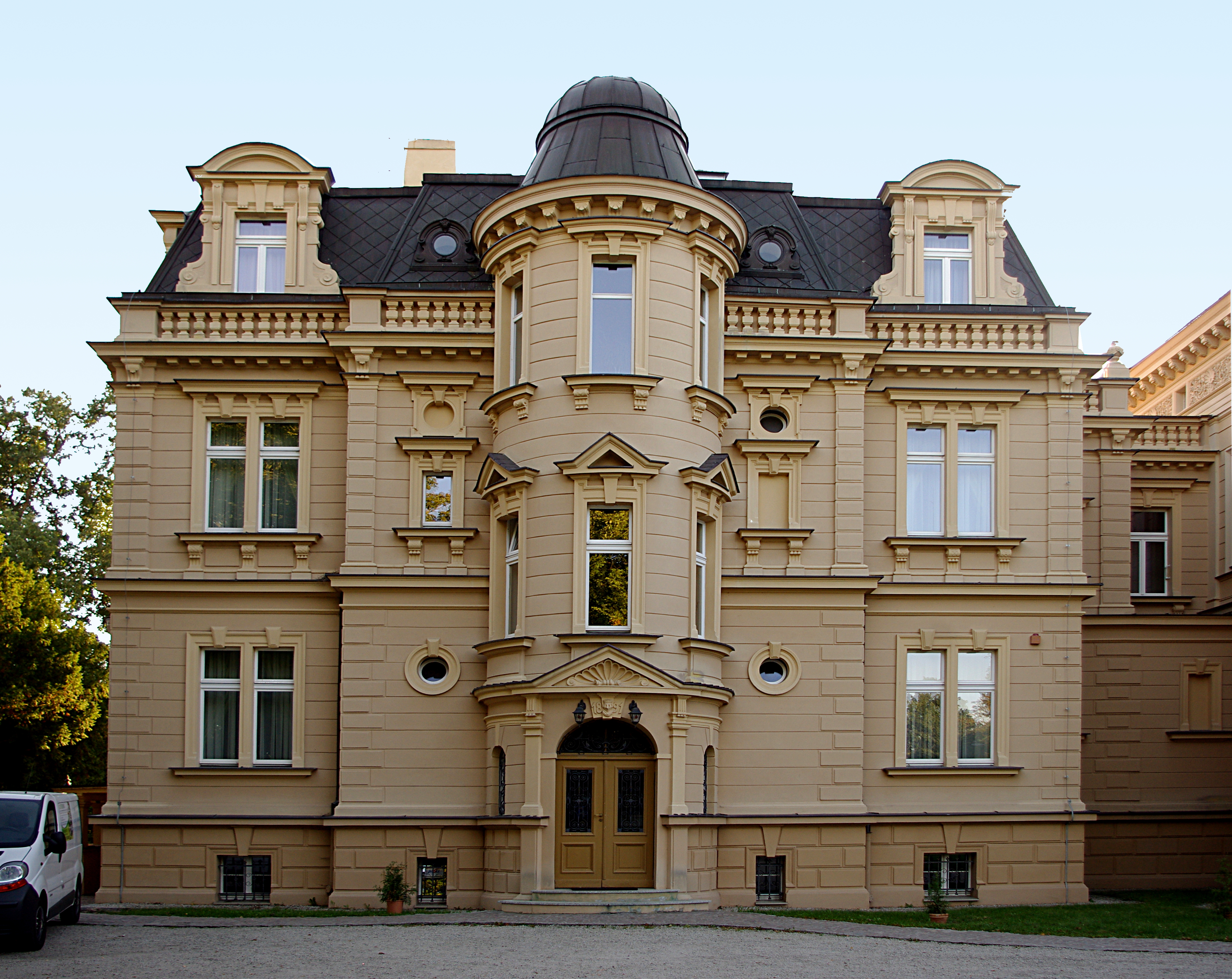
Hunting lodge

After having obtained in 1890, the consent of the Prussian authorities to inherit his wife's rights and possessions, Albrecht was granted in 1904, by the emperor a hereditary seat in the Prussian House of Lords and was designated imperial adviser on the centenary of the takeover of Ostromecko estate from Polish hands.

At the end of the 19th century, the Ostromecko land was one of the largest in the Chełmno area. It covered an area of 3,000 hectares (12 sq mi) with seven farms, a sawmill, a distillery, a brickyard and the Ostromecko Mineral Water factory, named the Maria Spring (German: Marien-Quelle) after Marta Matylda Maria Schönborn.

Count Albrecht and his wife had seven children:

- Frederike (1874–1926), a girl, married to Aleksander Bonawentura von Schickfus;
- Joachim Martin (1877–1967), who took over Ostromecko as the family's heir;
- Albrecht Udo Wilhelm (born 1879), a lawyer and economist, who managed from 1928 the estate of the Avensleben in Erxleben, Saxony-Anhalt;
- Maria Marta (born 1881) who married Ottokar von Möllendorff, a landowner in Saxony;
- Gebhard Johann (born 1884) who married Ruth, countess von Kalnein, owner of an estate in Głuchowo. During World War II, he was the commander of the Volksdeutscher Selbstschutz militia in Chełmża and as such he locally carried out the Intelligenzaktion Pommern operation, aiming at eradicating the Polish intelligentsia in the Pomeranian Voivodeship;
- Elisabeth Helene Matylde (born 1889) who married Burhard von Veltheim, a landowner;
- Ludolf Busso (born 1891), who received land in Cichoradz. He spent World War II in Switzerland, as a German opponent to Adolf Hitler.

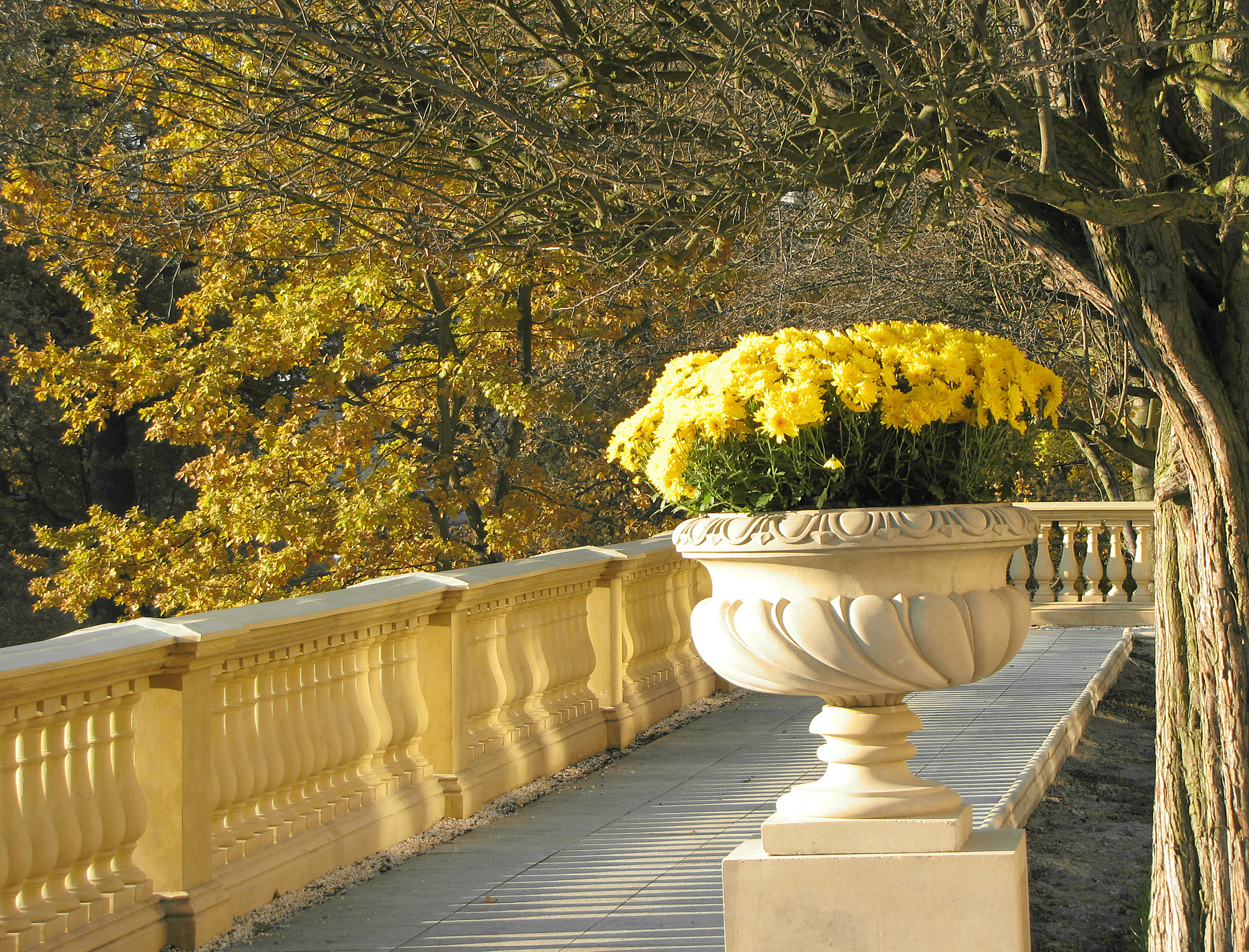
Terrace

The Ostromecko landlords were regularly donating to local undertakings in Ostromecko, as well as participating to the religious life of both the Evangelical and Catholic parishes. In 1904, the estate was visited for the second time by emperor Wilhelm II, where he was lavishly received at the New Palace. A mug used by the emperor has been kept in the Alvensleben family vault: it bore the inscription This cup was drank by His Majesty Emperor Wilhelm II, but was lost during WWII. From 1905 to 1912, Count Albrecht expanded once again the residence, following a design of Henryk Spier, a Poznań architect, with a ballroom. As far as the park is concerned, an extensive terrace with balustrade, pergolas and stairs were built, creating a unique viewpoint upon the Vistula.

Joachim served in Potsdam as an army cadet at the age of 15. He was involved in the circle of the Polish nobility from Poznań, where he met Katarzyna Bnińska (1884–1969). She was the daughter from the Count Bolesław and Katarzyna Taczanowski Bniński who owned estates in Dąbki and Samostrzel. In 1908, Joachim Martin married Katarzyna in London. For some time, the young couple traveled around Europe, then lived in Katarzyna's parents' house.

Katarzyna Bnińska had in 1908 a son, Albrecht Werner Rodriguez (1906–1965), from an extra-marital affair with a Spanish professor. In 1910, the couple had a son, Ludolf (1910–1996), born in Ostromecko. In 1915, after his mother died, Joachim was handed over the Ostromecko estate, while his father Albrecht left to his land in Erxleben, where he was buried after his death on January 16, 1928. During World War I, Joachim served in the German cavalry, receiving the rank of captain. After the defeat of Germany, he returned to Ostromecko in 1918, to manage the estate. From this year on, Katarzyna lived separately from him and eventually divorced in 1921, moving initially to her villa in Sopot and later to Oberstdorf. Both children (Ludolf and his step brother Albrecht Werner "Rodrigez"), however, remained under the responsibility of Joachim and attended schools in Bydgoszcz. Joachim Martin married Gizel von Kaszona, his second wife from Hungarian origin, in Paris.

=== Interwar period ===
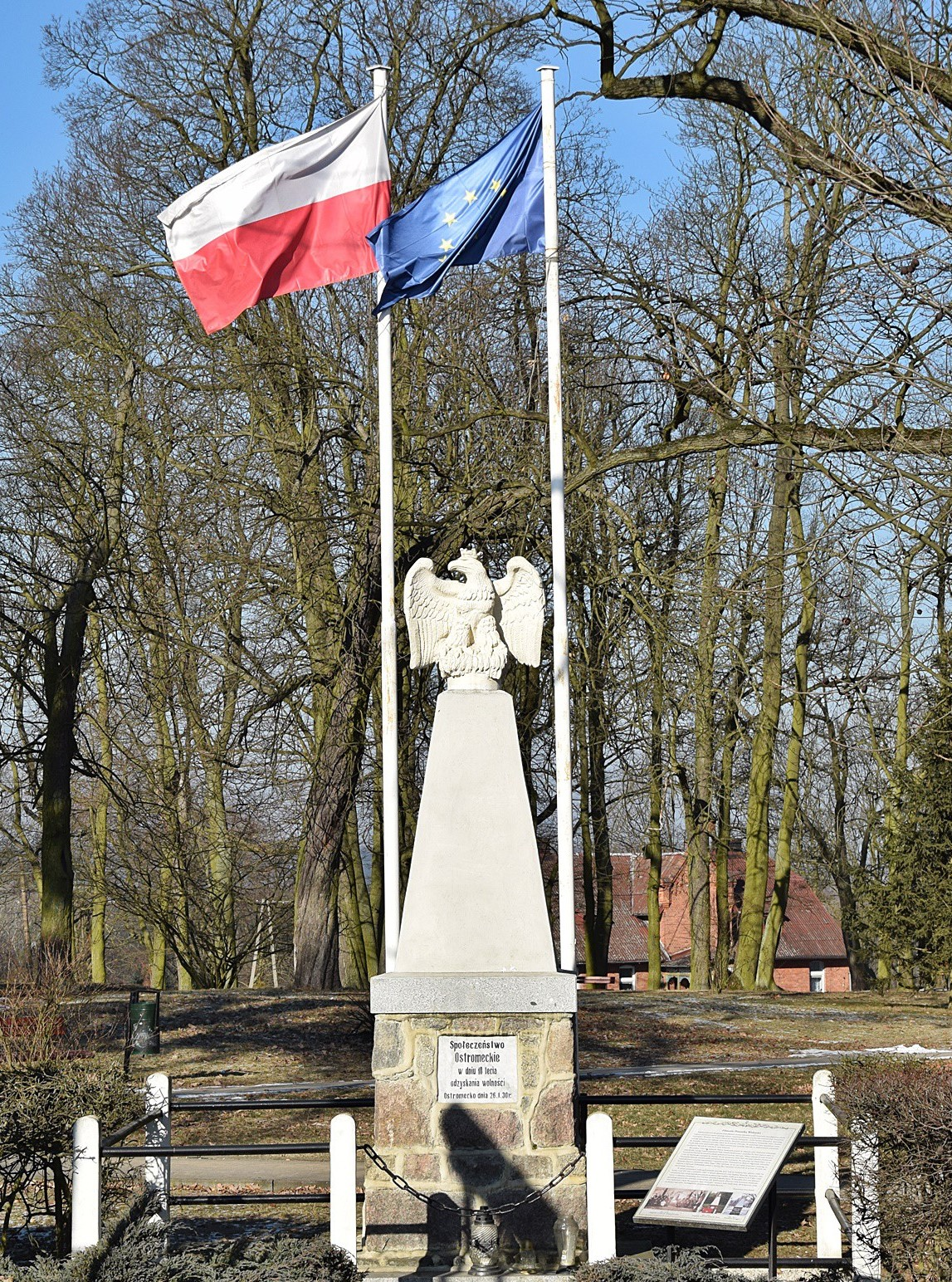
Monument to the 10th anniversary of the Polish Independence-1930

In 1920, as a consequence of the Treaty of Versailles, Ostromecko returned to the reborn Polish state. The estate was administered by Count Joachim von Alvensleben, as a Polish citizen of German nationality and of Protestant faith, who had favorable attitude towards the Polish authorities.

He employed many Poles in his estate, and regularly sold the parcelled land to Polish farmers (1930, 1938, 1939). In 1930, when the Association of Insurgents and Soldiers of Ostromecko initiated the erection of a monument to commemorate the 10th anniversary of national independence, Joachim Alvensleben provided construction materials and bricklayers. Later, in June 1939, he also donated 6,000 zlotys to the National Defense Fund.

He regularly organized hunts with the participation of the landed gentry elite in his forest estate. Joachim von Alvensleben was passionate about horse breeding: he settled a thoroughbred stud farm, a riding arena and a private horse race track. His best steeds, Piękna Barbara (Polish: Beautiful Barbara) and Bandyta (Polish: Bandit) won many races and were rewarded awards at national and international events. In 1939, 48 horses were bred in Ostromecko.

In 1927, the Ostromecko demesne consisted of 7 independent estates, a distillery, a sawmill, two brickyards, the mineral water factory and horse stables. It covered an area of 6,235 hectares (24.07 sq mi), including 2,566 hectares (9.91 sq mi) of arable land and 2,974 hectares (11.48 sq mi) of forests. The domain supported Catholic churches in Ostromecko (Saint Nicholas-Saint Stanislaus-Saint John the Baptist parish) and Boluminek, as well as an Evangelical church (Saint Paul parish) and a chapel at the Avrensleben-Schönborn cemetery. In addition, the "Marien-Quelle" mineral water provided an important source of income and prestige, being exported abroad and awarded multiple times (1895, 1898, 1927).

=== German occupation ===
Prior to the outset of World War II, a Polish sapper unit was billeted in Ostromecko: on September 2, 1939, it carried out the blow up of the Fordon bridge on several spans. However, German troops entered the estate two to three days later. Members of the local Selbstschutz militia arrested and murdered about 60 Poles, previously identified on a list. Some were sent to concentration camps, others were shot in the nearby forest. The commandant of Ostromecko militia was SS-Rottenführer Albrecht Werner von Alvensleben, the older son of Count Albrecht.

In 1940, a camp for English prisoners of war was established in the Old Palace. From the spring of 1944, German army used for accommodation means both palaces, the old barracks and even some apartments of the local population. Albrecht Werner von Avensleben administered the estate in Ostromecko until 1943, when he was removed from the SS ranks. In September 1943, the domain was then confiscated by the Treasury of the Third Reich, which nominated Karl Anton von Falkenheim, a Selbstschutz member from Hallerowo near Władysławowo, as an administrator.

Afterwards, the New Palace housed a Wehrmacht radio monitoring unit and a group from the Vlasov army. A landing strip was arranged in the vicinity (near today's Ostromecko-Zabasta housing estate) and used by light aircraft to reach Berlin.

==== Ludolf Alvensleben-Schönborn ====
In his youth, Ludolf was sympathetic towards Poles. He served in the Polish Army as a corporal and as a cadet. Likewise, he was active in the Polish sports and gymnastic Society Strzelec. In Ostromecko, he organized the sports club (KS Ostromecko) that his father had established in 1927, as well as an automobile club. He even represented Poland in a motorcycle race in 1929 in Barcelona.

On May 3, 1938, Ludolf von Alvensleben-Schönborn married a youg Dutch woman, Mimosa Kiitzing. In spring 1939, the couple visited Ludolf's mother Katarzyna in Oberstdorf: that's where they heard about the WWII outbreak. They later learned that Joachim Martin, his father, had been sent at the end of 1939 to Dachau concentration camp and then moved to Buchenwald. Fortunately, the Alvensleben-Schönborn family (Ludolf and his ex-wife Katarzyna), together with Alberto Bellardiricci, a former Italian ambassador in Berlin and a personal friend of Joachim from the Ostromecko hunting parties in the 1930s, were able to pull strings to get him released on February 9, 1940. Nevertheless, Joachim had been identified as a category III in the Deutsche Volksliste. As such he was deprived of his property in Ostromecko and banned to return to German-occupied Poland: he then left with his ex-wife to live in Oberstdorf.

Meanwhile, Ludolf had settled with his wife Mimosa in Rome. In the spring of 1944, Ludolf volunteered for the Anders' Army and took part to the Battle of Monte Cassino in the ranks of the 2nd Polish Corps. After the war, he settled in London as an active Polish emigrant. In 1956, he moved with his second wife Violette Rigolett to Oberstdorf, where he ran Villa Arosa, a guest house. In 1990 and 1996, the couple made trips back to Ostromecko, Bydgoszcz and Toruń. Ludolf died on September 22, 1996, in Oberstdorf.

==== Albrecht Werner ====
Ludolf was soon leading the administration of the estate and, according to their father's plans, was also to inherit the property. This situation faced a strong opposition from Ludolf's stepbrother Albrecht Werner: in 1924, conflicting with his father, he left the house to live in a farm at Cichoradz, approximately 13 km from Ostromecko. There, he favored the German revisionist movement. Until the outbreak of World War II, Albrecht Werner attempted to have the justice appoint a curator to his stepfather for the estate in Ostromecko, so as to prevent Ludolf to get the inheritance of the domain.

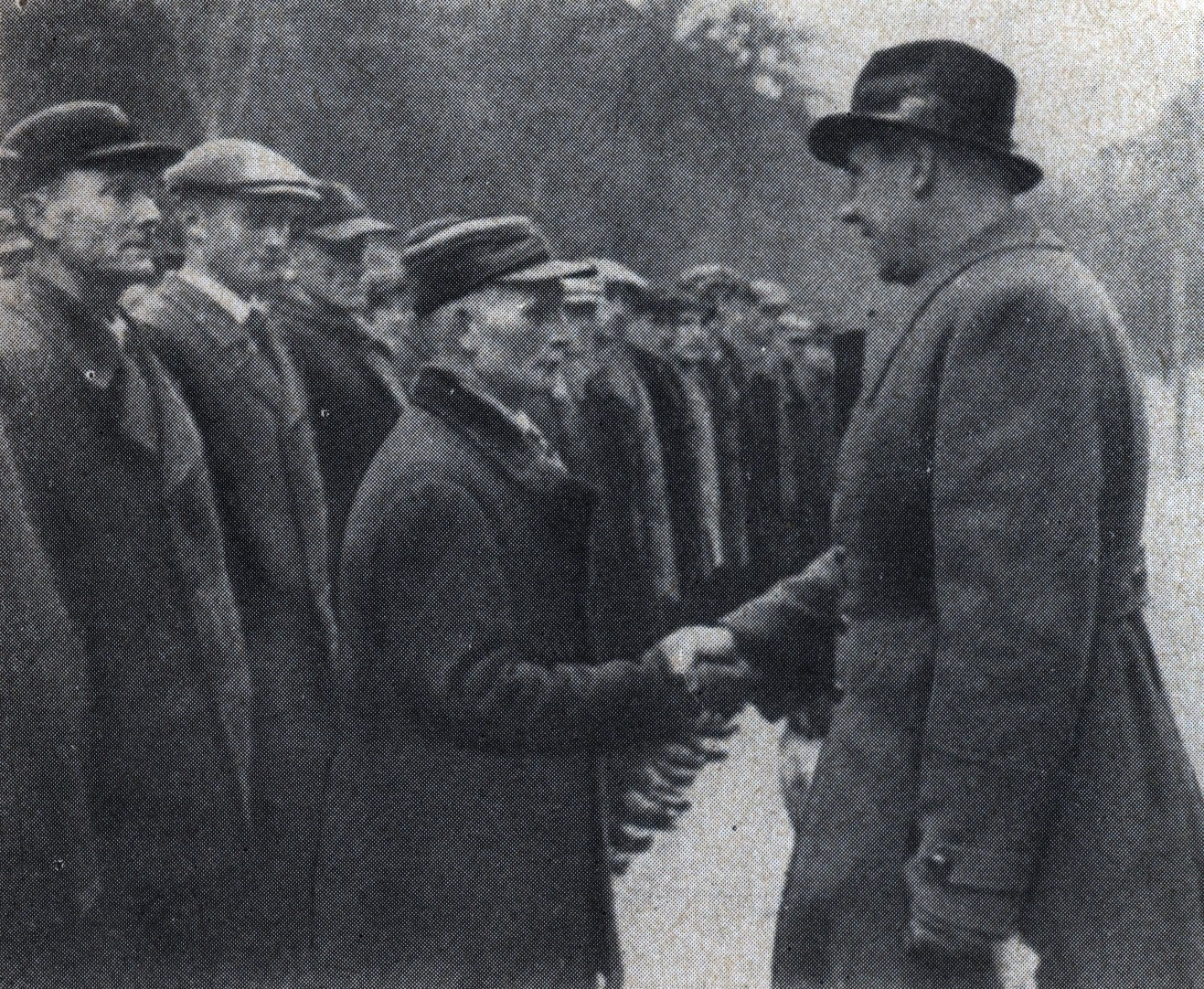
The fifth column training in forest near Ostromecko

Albrecht Werner von Alvensleben-Schönborn married in 1936, Dagmara von Kreis, from Sławkowo. In this place, a German fifth column training centre had been established. While serving in the 18th Pomeranian Uhlan Regiment in Grudziądz, he deserted shortly before the start of the war and fled to the Free City of Danzig. Over there, he served until September 15, 1939, in the SS Heimwehr Danzig and afterwards he commanded a unit of the Pomeranian Volksdeutscher Selbstschutz in Ostromecko. Werner had also two cousins who joined the German forces:

- SS-Brigadeführer Ludolf von Alvensleben. He served as an adjutant of Heinrich Himmler (1938–1941) then commander of the Selbstchutz in Pomerania;
- SS-Standartenführer Jakob Ludolf von Avensleben.

In September 1939, he had his stepfather Joachim von Alvensleben arrested for pro-Polish activities and sent him to concentration camps. However, Joachim was released in early 1940, thanks to the combined efforts of his ex-wife Katarzyna and the Italian diplomat Alberto Bellardiricci.

In 1939, Werner actively participated at the head of his Selbstschutz unit to the murder of 60 Polish citizen, which caused his wife Dagmara to leave him. Incorporated into the 3rd SS Panzer Division Totenkopf, Werner fought for a while on the Eastern Front, before being evacuated to a military hospital in Warsaw to treat is wounds. Albeit promoted to the SS officer rank of Obersturmführer, he was expelled from the SS in autumn 1941, when the Gestapo was informed about his mother being Polish. In addition, Werner was deprived of his position as manager of the Ostromecko estate that he occupied since the German invasion.

The Avensleben family, at the origin of this disclosure, furthermore renounced Albrecht Werner and revoked him the right to use the name Alvensleben-Schönborn. For many years he lived hidden, partly in Argentina; he died in 1965, in the town of Zelle in West Germany. After WWII, in 1949, the District Court in Toruń had sentenced him to death in absentia.

=== Post-war period ===
After World War II, the Polish Land Reform (1944) stripped the Alvensleben-Schönborn family from their rights on Ostromecko estate, which was taken over by the State Treasury. In 1945, the palaces, park and mausoleum were plundered by soldiers of the Red Army and the local population. To this day, little remains of the private Alvensleben collection. In 1946, the Commission for the liquidation of post-German property allocated most of the domain (i.e. palaces, four residential houses, an administrative house, a gardener's house, the park and part of the arable land) to the use of the School and Educational Centre for Disabled and Deaf Children in Bydgoszcz, which operated there till 1989.

This institution, active till the 1920s at 7 Mikołaja Reja Street in Bydgoszcz, had been reactivated after the war. In Ostromecko, it used the Old Palace as a school building and set up the pupil lodgings and offices in the New Palace. During the communist period, facilities were partially devastated: historic parquetry had been covered with tiles, ancient walls pannelled with plywood, fireplaces walled up and stuccoes blanketed with several layers of oil paint.

In 1985, the Pomeranian Philharmonic took over the management of the Old Palace and the surrounding park: at the time, the ensemble was nicknamed "Bydgoszcz Wilanów" and it was planned to transform it into a regional cultural centre.

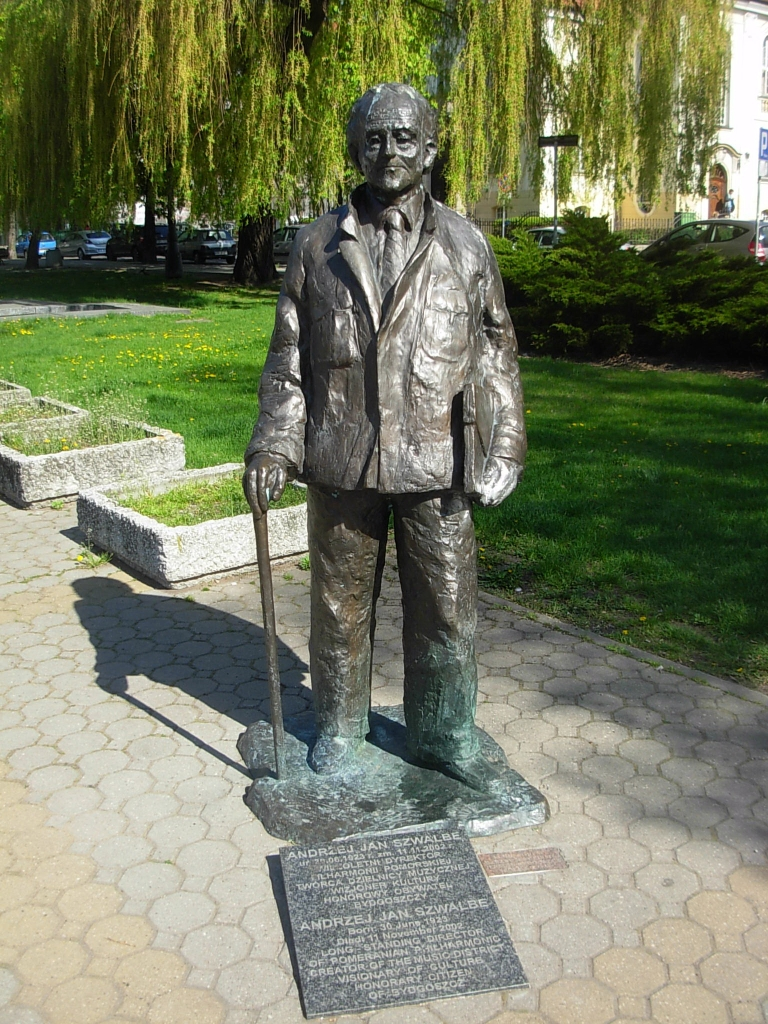
Szwalbe statue in front of the Pomeranian Philharmonic building in Bydgoszcz

Thanks to the initiative and passion of Andrzej Szwalbe, then director of the Pomeranian Philharmonic, the Old Palace received a collection of contemporary Polish paintings and graphics, as well as 50 historic upright and grand pianos. Additionally, valuable books, reprints of old works, mainly about the Age of Enlightenment moved there. From 1985 to 1989, exhibitions and concerts in the Old Palace took place, welcoming, among others, Tadeusz Brzozowski, Krzysztof Penderecki, Henryk Górecki, Halina Czerny-Stefańska, Regina Smendzianka and many artists of international renown. In 1986, renovation works in the palace as well as in the park were carried out. On October 15, 1987, the Ostromecko Foundation was endorsed by Aleksander Krawczuk, then Minister of Culture: it allowed funds collection for the general overhaul of the facility.

At the end of the 1980s, Aleksander and Adam Pietrzak designed the program and spatial concept of Ostromecko:

- a painting gallery and the piano museum in the Old Palace;
- a restaurant, café and hotel in the New Palace;
- recreation and relaxation facilities in the park.

On May 6–9, 1990, at the Ostromecko Foundation's initiative, the complex welcomed Count Ludolf von Alvensleben, the last landlord of the Ostromecko estate; he came a second time in 1996, a few months before his demise. The Count donated 6 paintings from his own collection to the facility.

From the 1990s onwards, piano and vocal recitals together with chamber concerts have been organized in the Old Palace. During this period, the New Palace has been refurbished. In 1992, the Bydgoszcz Voivodeship took ownership of the park and the New Palace. From 1993 to 1998 it housed an art school run by Andrzej Nowak and Janusz Hetman and then a TV production school Szkoła Realizacji Telewizyjnych. In 1996, the City of Bydgoszcz purchased the New Palace and the park, willing to develop a cultural and recreational centre for the city's inhabitants, in particular those living in the growing Fordon district, facing Ostromecko on the other side of the Vistula. Since 2000, the Municipal Cultural Centre in Bydgoszcz is administrating the ensemble on behalf of Bydgoszcz city. Starting from 1997, heavy restoration works have been carried out in the park, similarly from 2001 in the New Palace, under the supervision of the provincial monuments conservator:

- drainage and protection of the foundations;
- new kitchen and storage facilities in the basement;
- new ventilation and air conditioning;
- renovated central heating and water supply;
- marble floors laying;
- windows replacement and new lighting was installed.

As far as the Old Palace is concerned, it has been owned from 2000 to 2008 by the Kuyavian-Pomeranian Voivodeship Marshal's Office, before being bought by the city of Bydgoszcz. It is handled by the Pomeranian Philharmonic. In the late 1990s, Old Palace interiors have been revamped:

- the kitchen was converted into a wine bar;
- the ballroom renovated with stuccoed molding on the walls and ceilings;
- other rooms were refurbished with specific features (banquet, gold, green).

Since 1996, many cultural events have been held in the palace and the park, including:

- music concerts (Bydgoszcz Symphony Orchestra, academic concerts, etc.);
- theater performances;
- art exhibitions;
- artist vernissages.

The palaces hosted also balls, games, special events, meetings and scientific gatherings, political and social rallies, such as the Obiady czwartkowe (English: Thursday dinners) devoted to Bydgoszcz.

The palace complex has been thoroughly revitalized as part of a two-stage project entitled "Ostromecko - the four seasons", between 2007 and 2011, thanks to a common funding shared by the city of Bydgoszcz and the European Regional Development Fund, for a total amount of 4 725 966.44 zlotys.

In 2018, the terraces around the New Palace, the drainage system, and the adjacent walls have been insulated and repaired. Moreover, part of the roof has been renovated, together with the northern pergola. Inside, additional renovation works have been performed (e.g. renovation of parquetry).

== Gallery ==
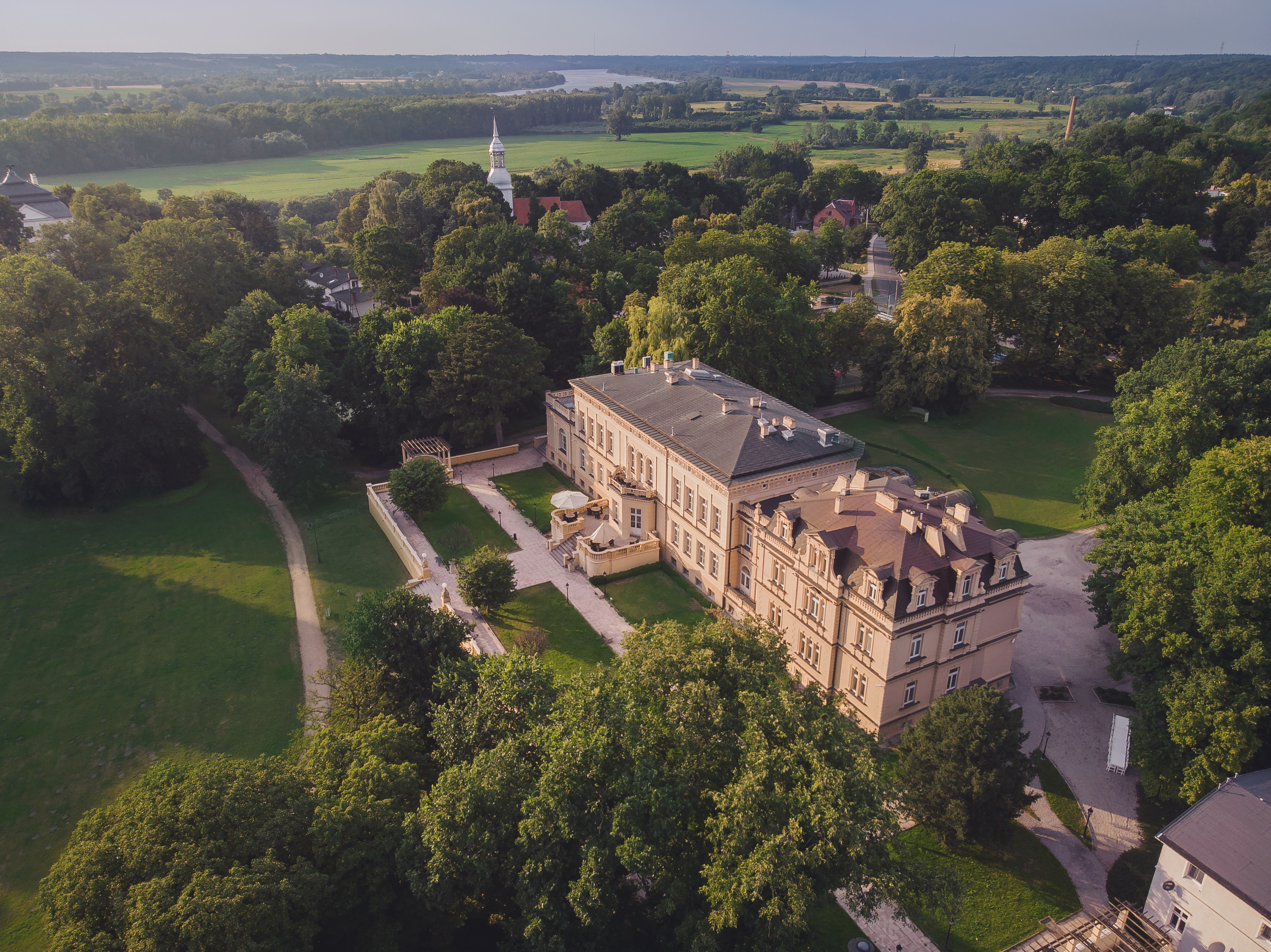
The New Palace and the church

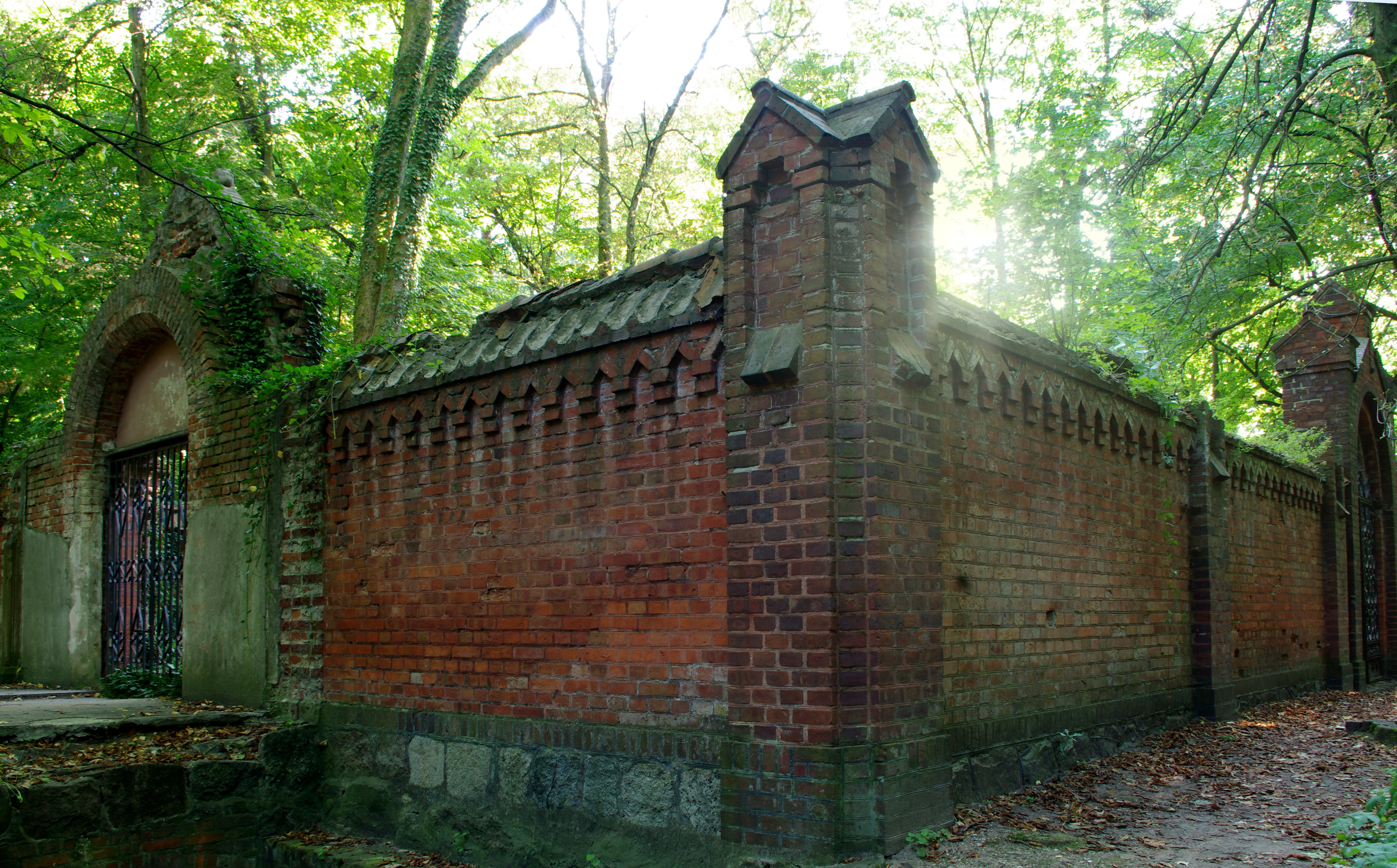
Neo-Romanesque mausoleum of the Schönborn and Alvensleben families

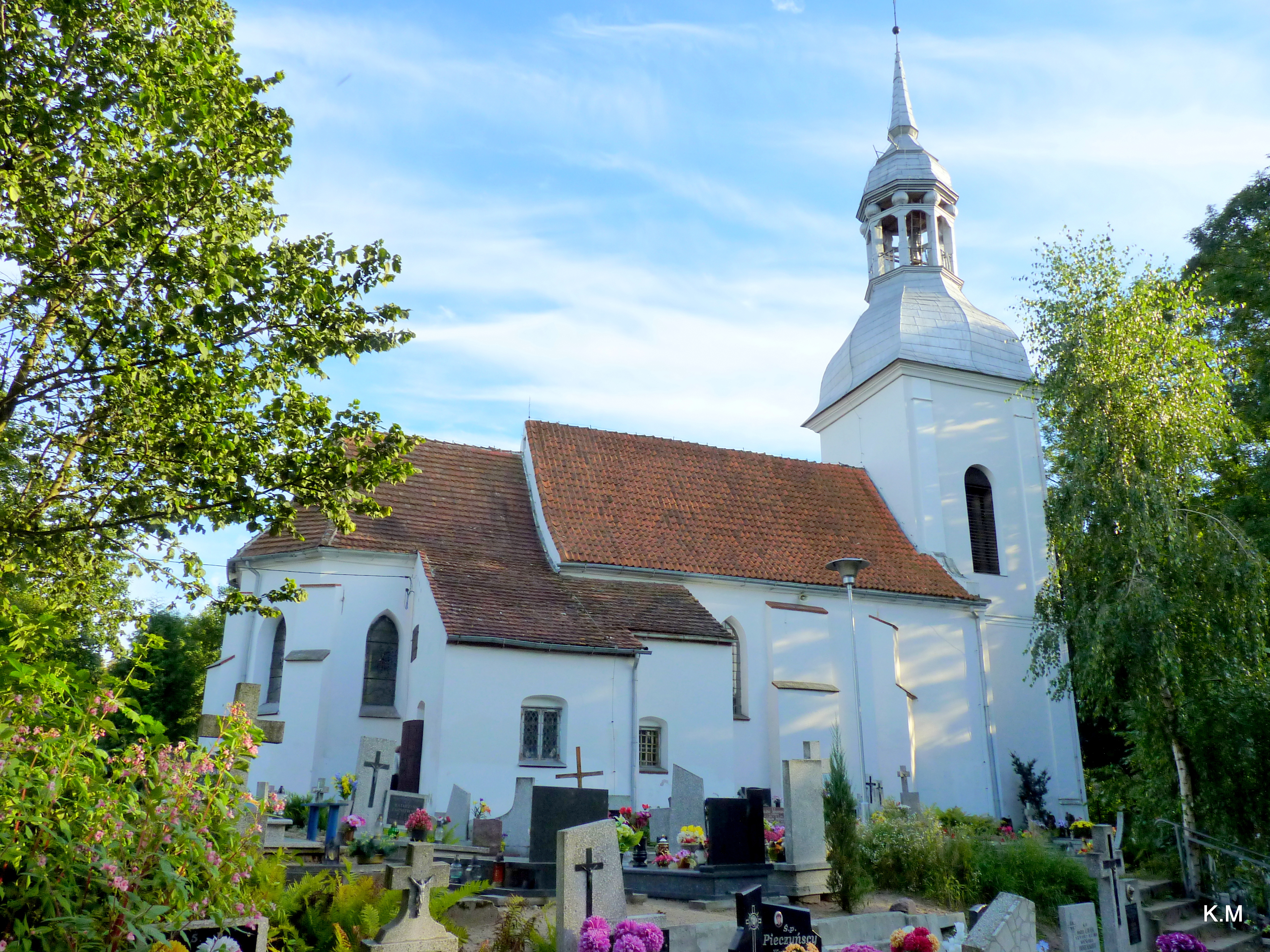
Saint Nicholas-Saint Stanislaus-Saint John the Baptist church

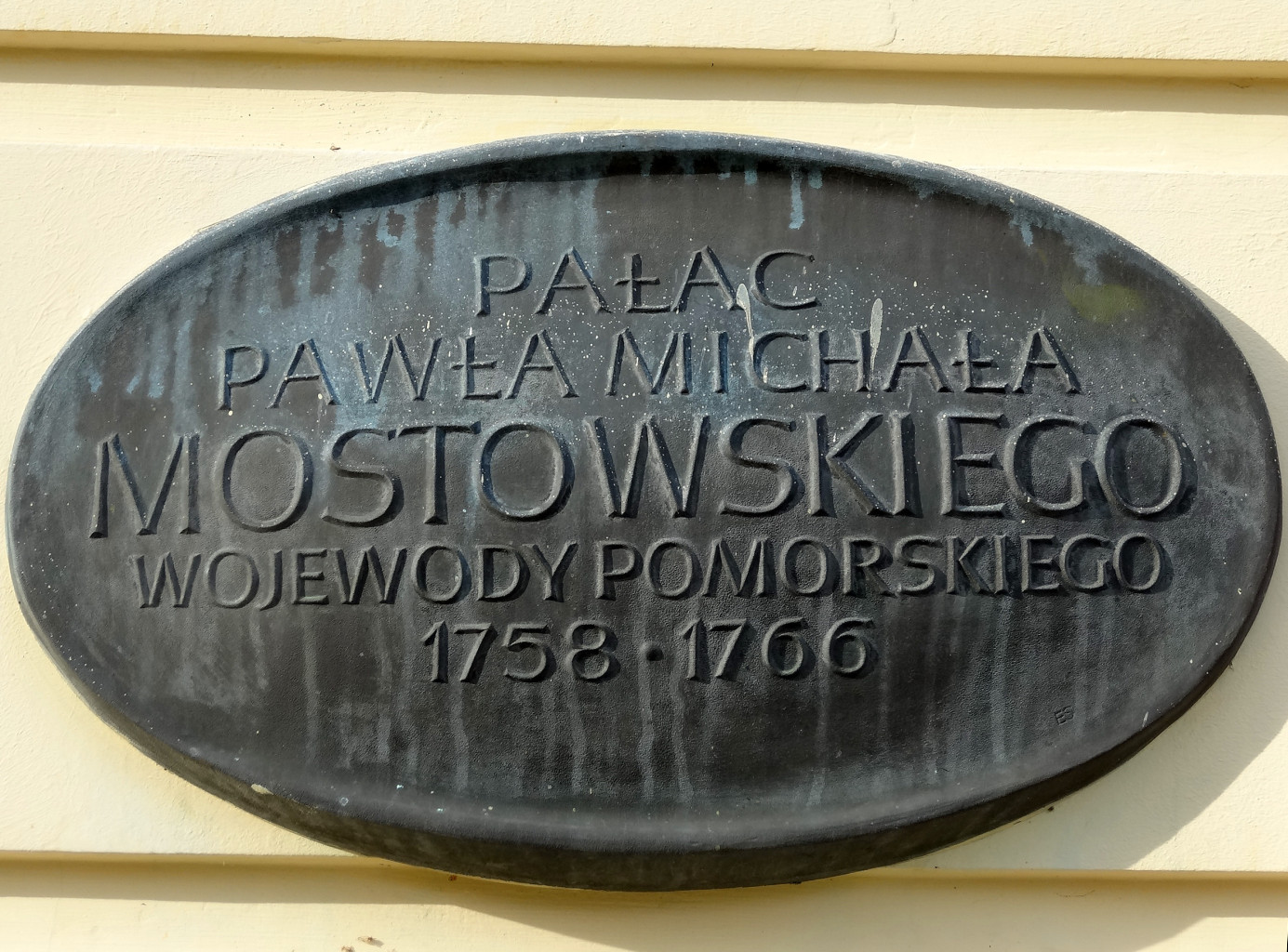
Commemorative cartouche on the Old Palace

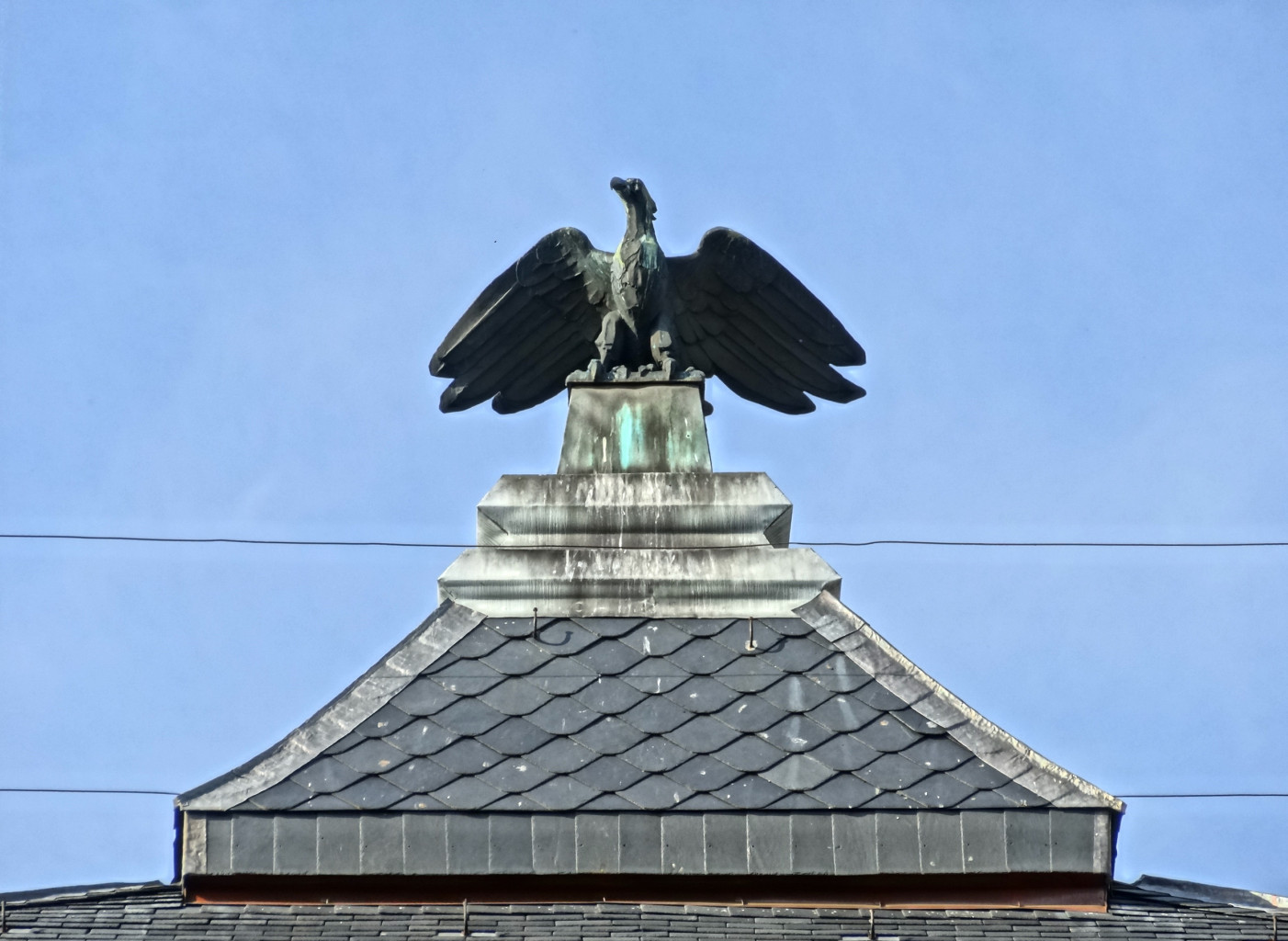
Eagle figure on top of the Old Palace

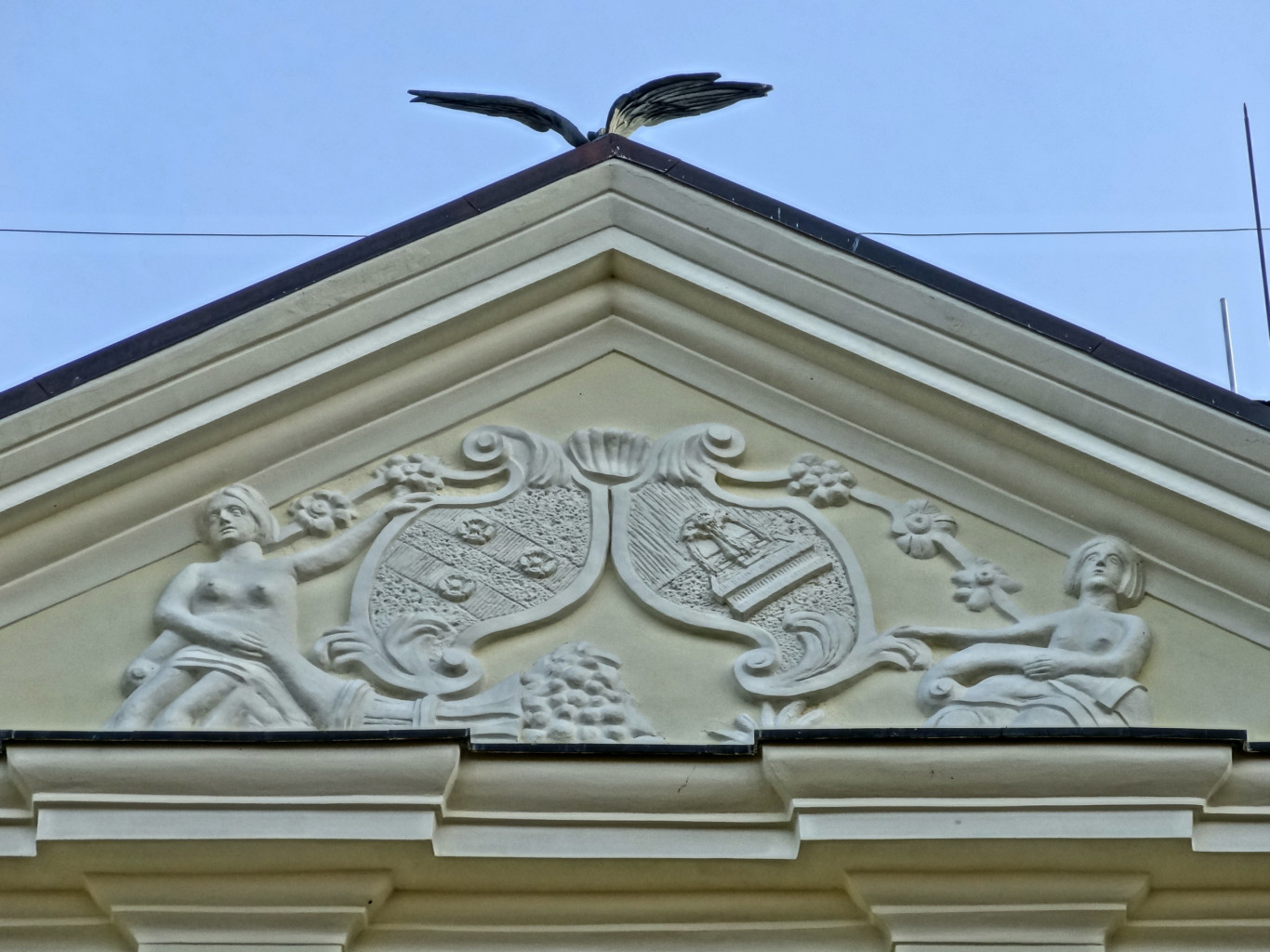
Old Palace - Detail of the front pediment

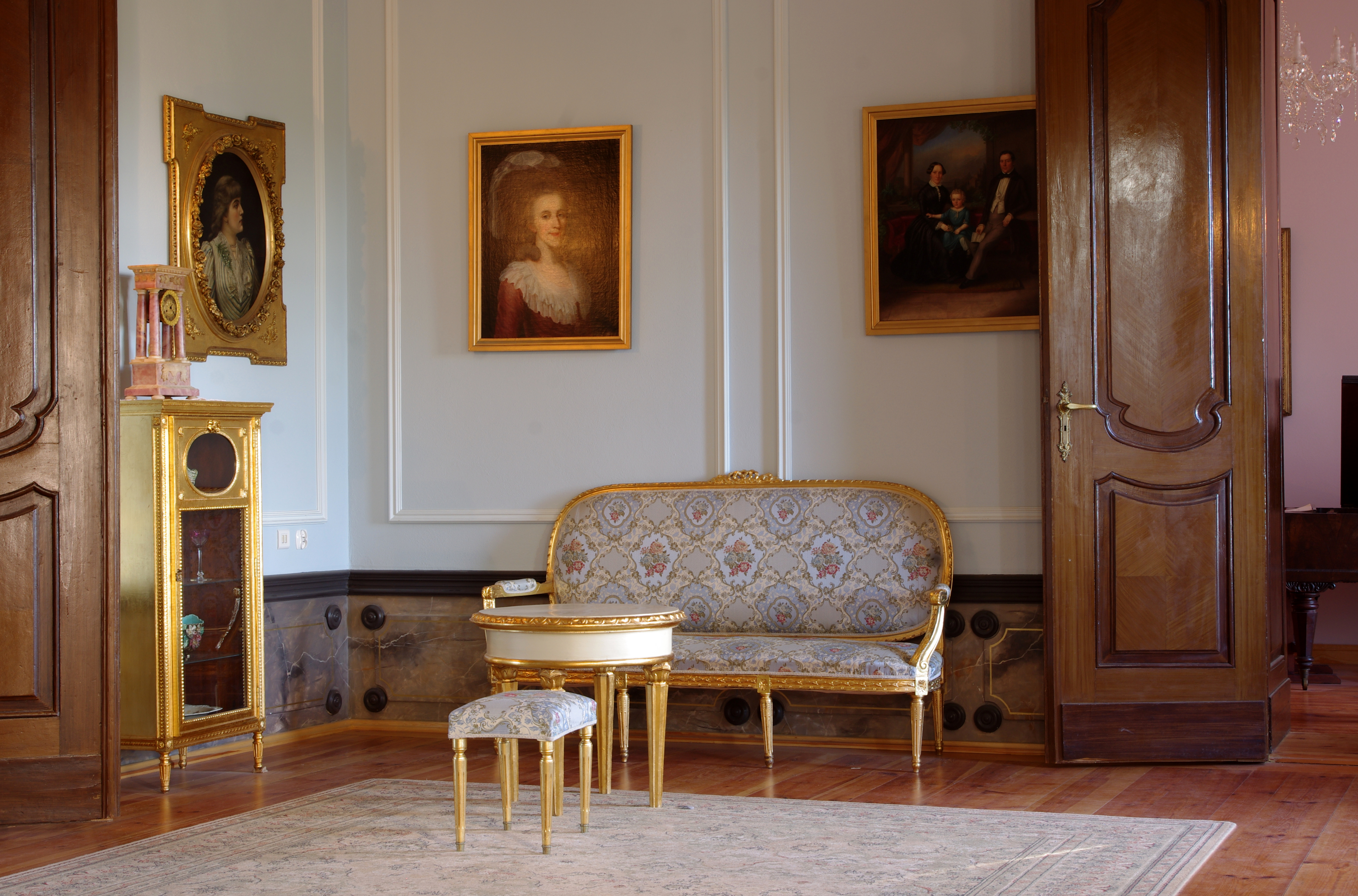
Old Palace - Interiors

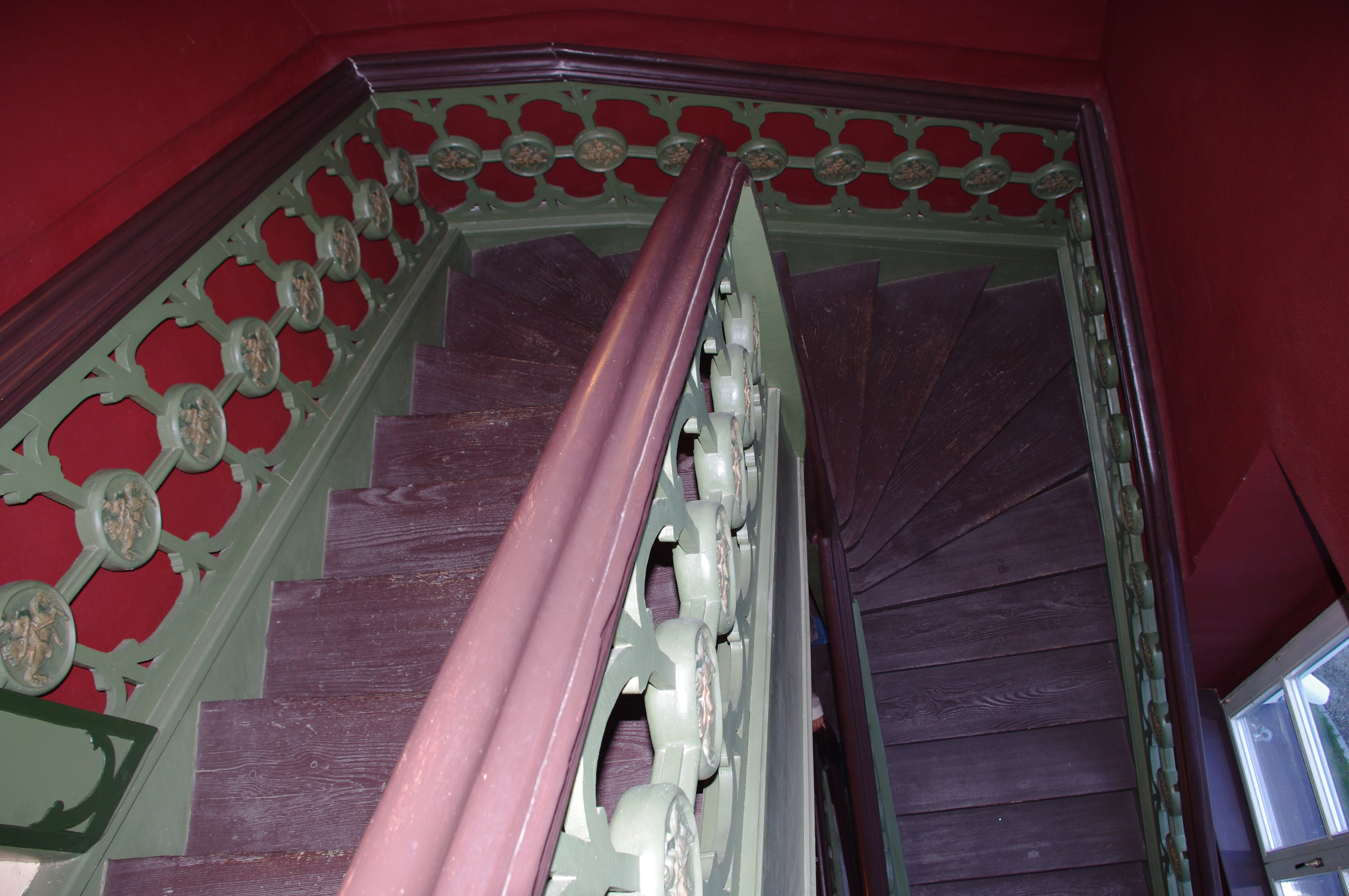
Old Palace - Renovated wooden staircase

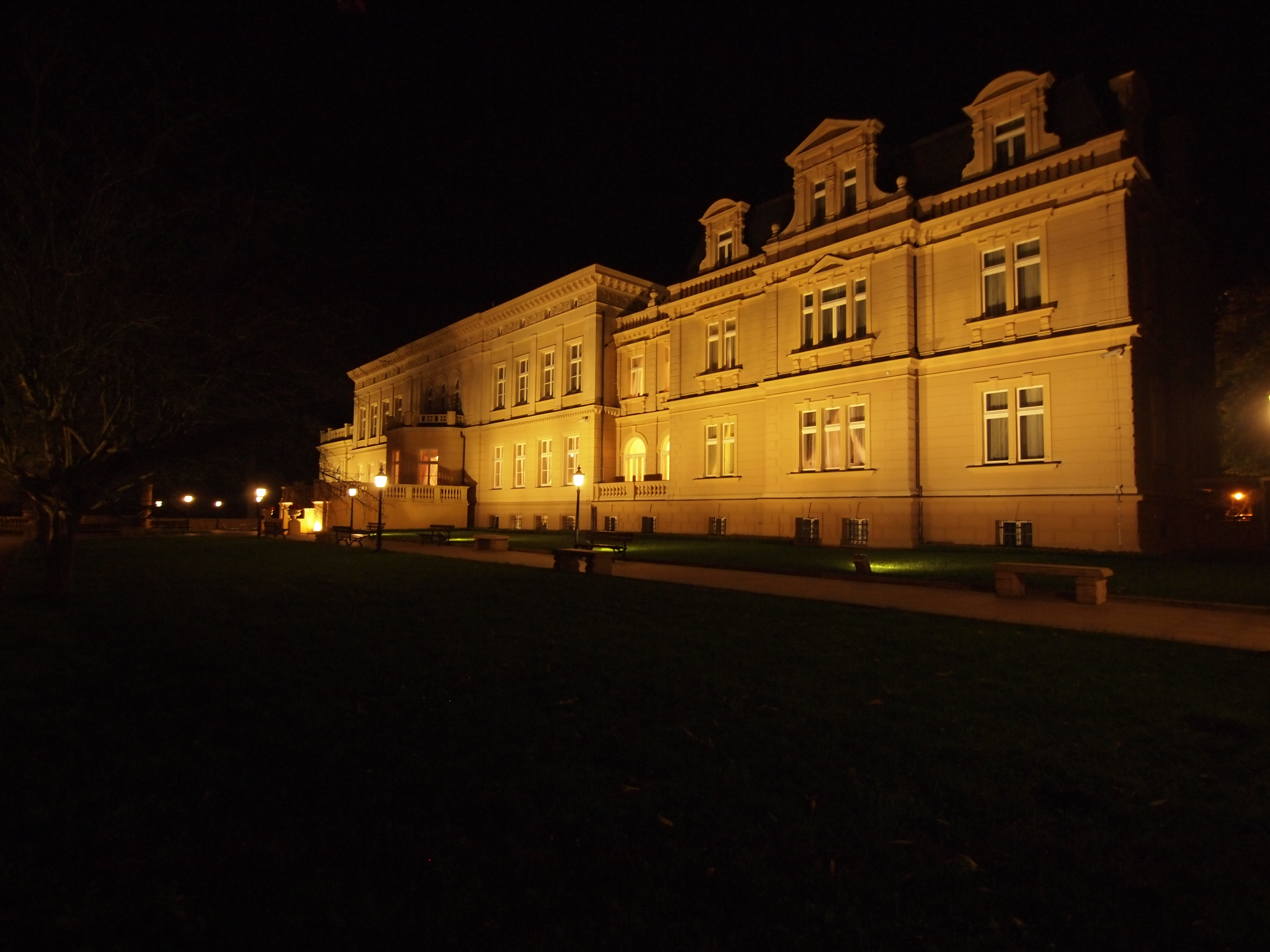
New Palace by night

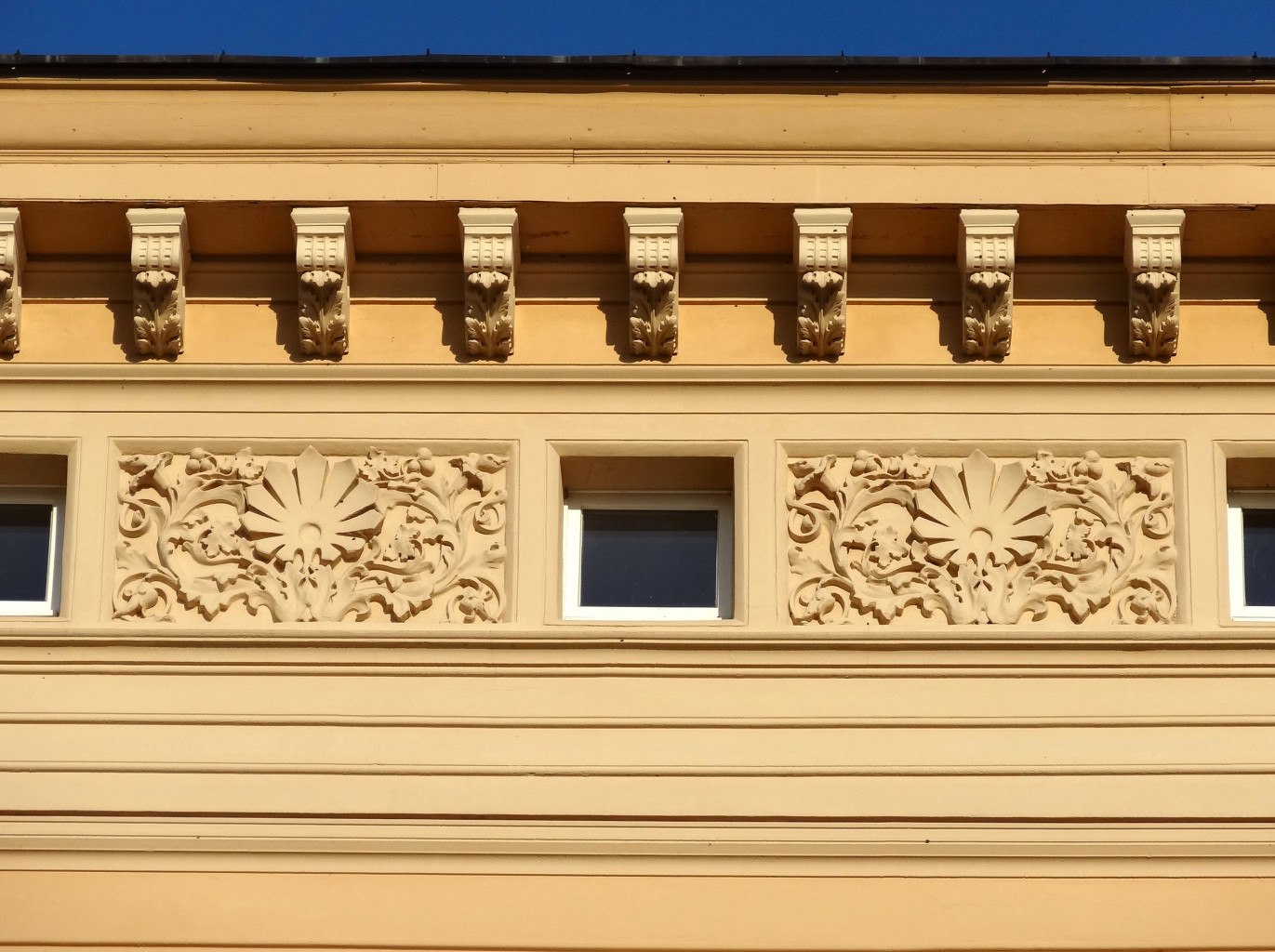
New Palace - details of the stuccoes and corbel tables

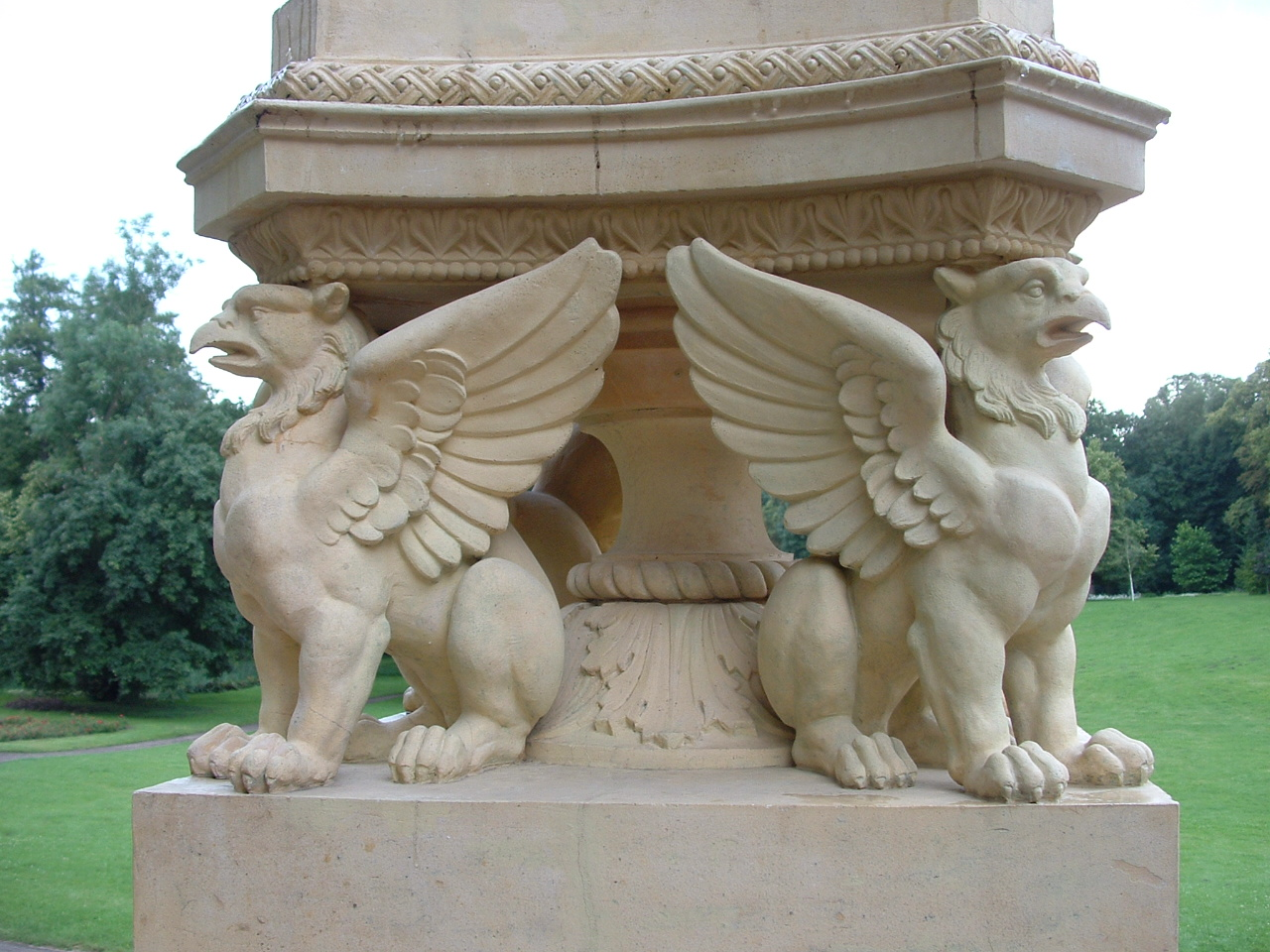
New Palace- garden sculpture

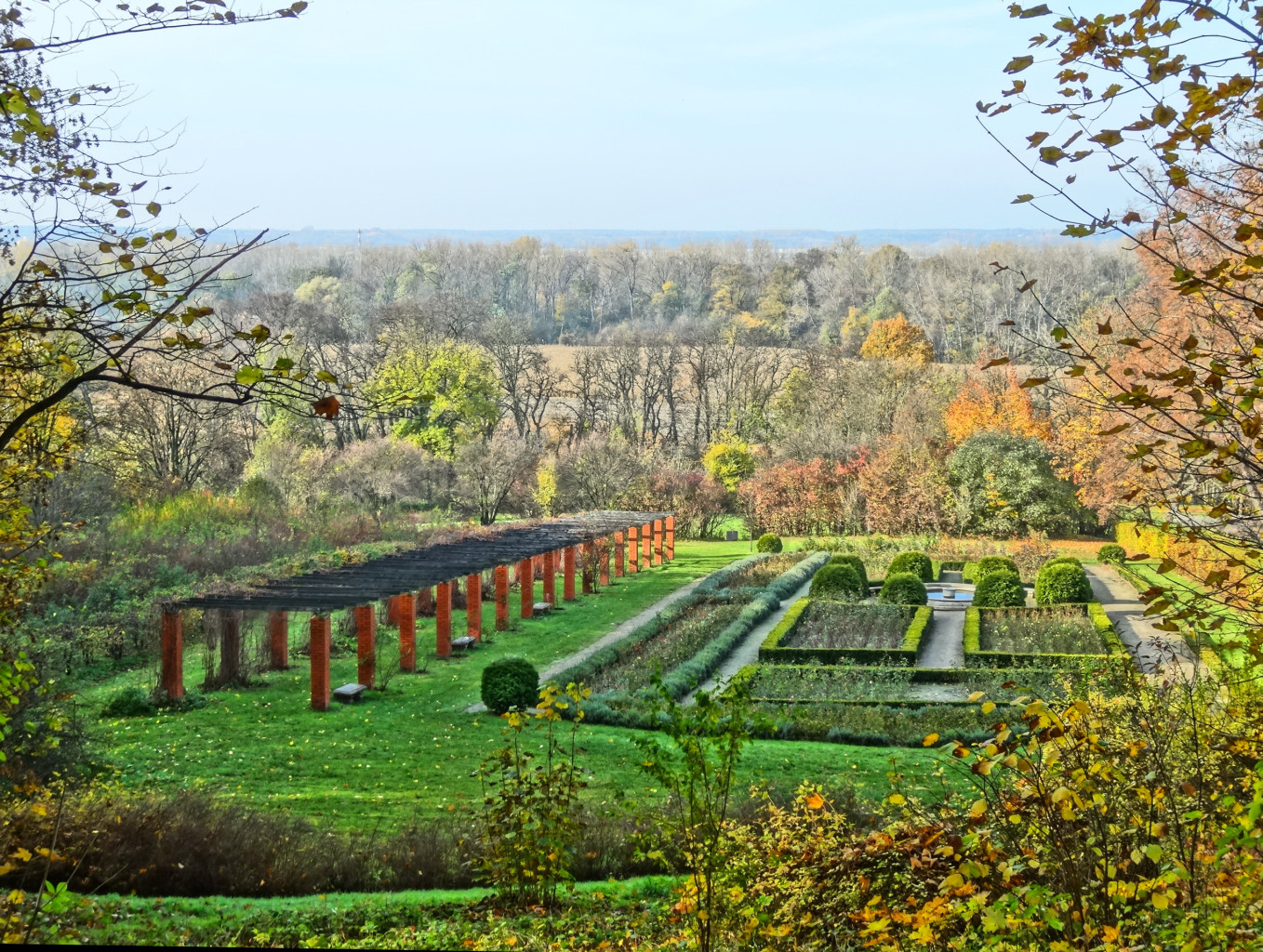
Garden

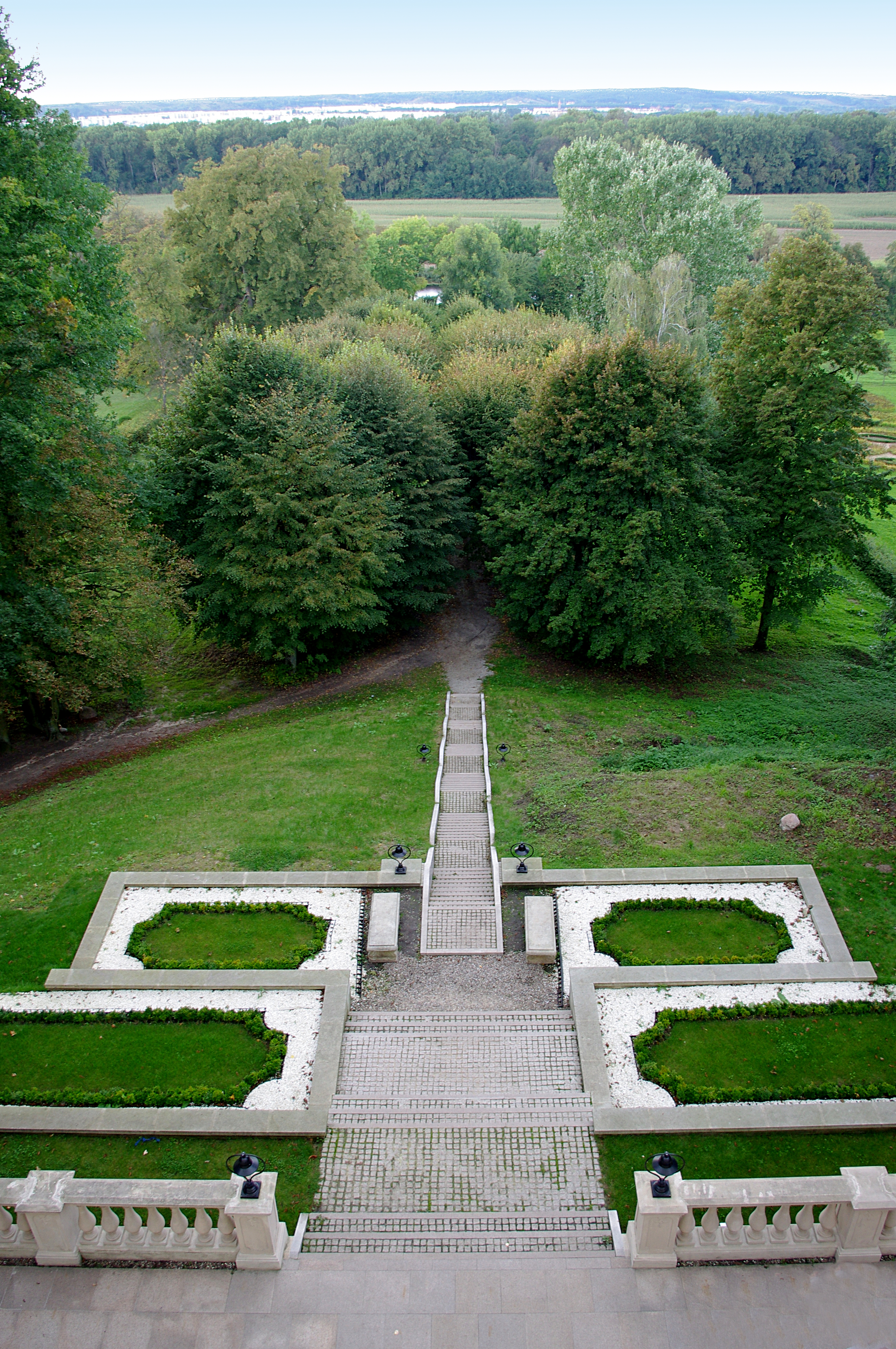
View of the terraces down to the linden alle

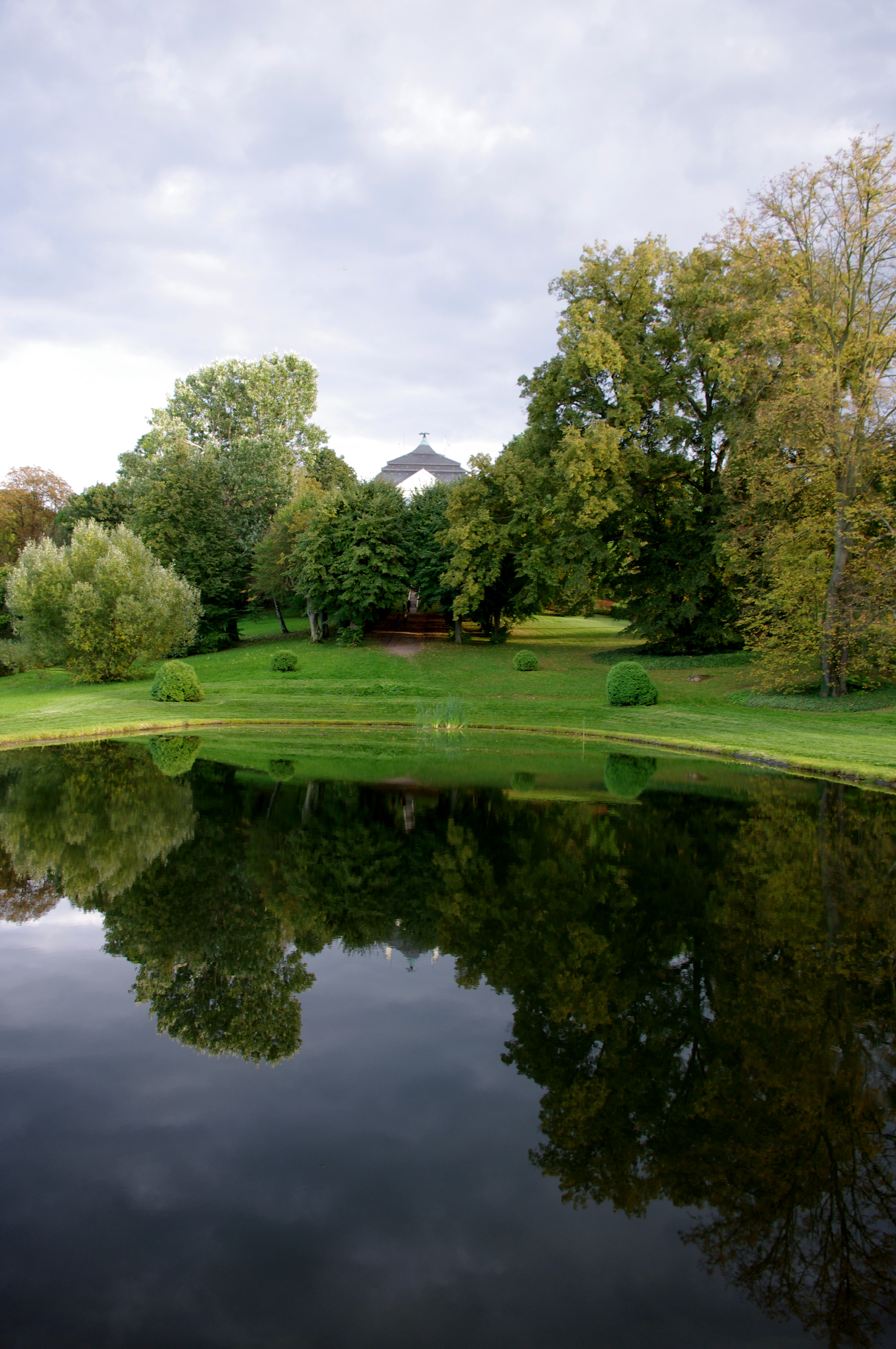
Pond by the Old Palace

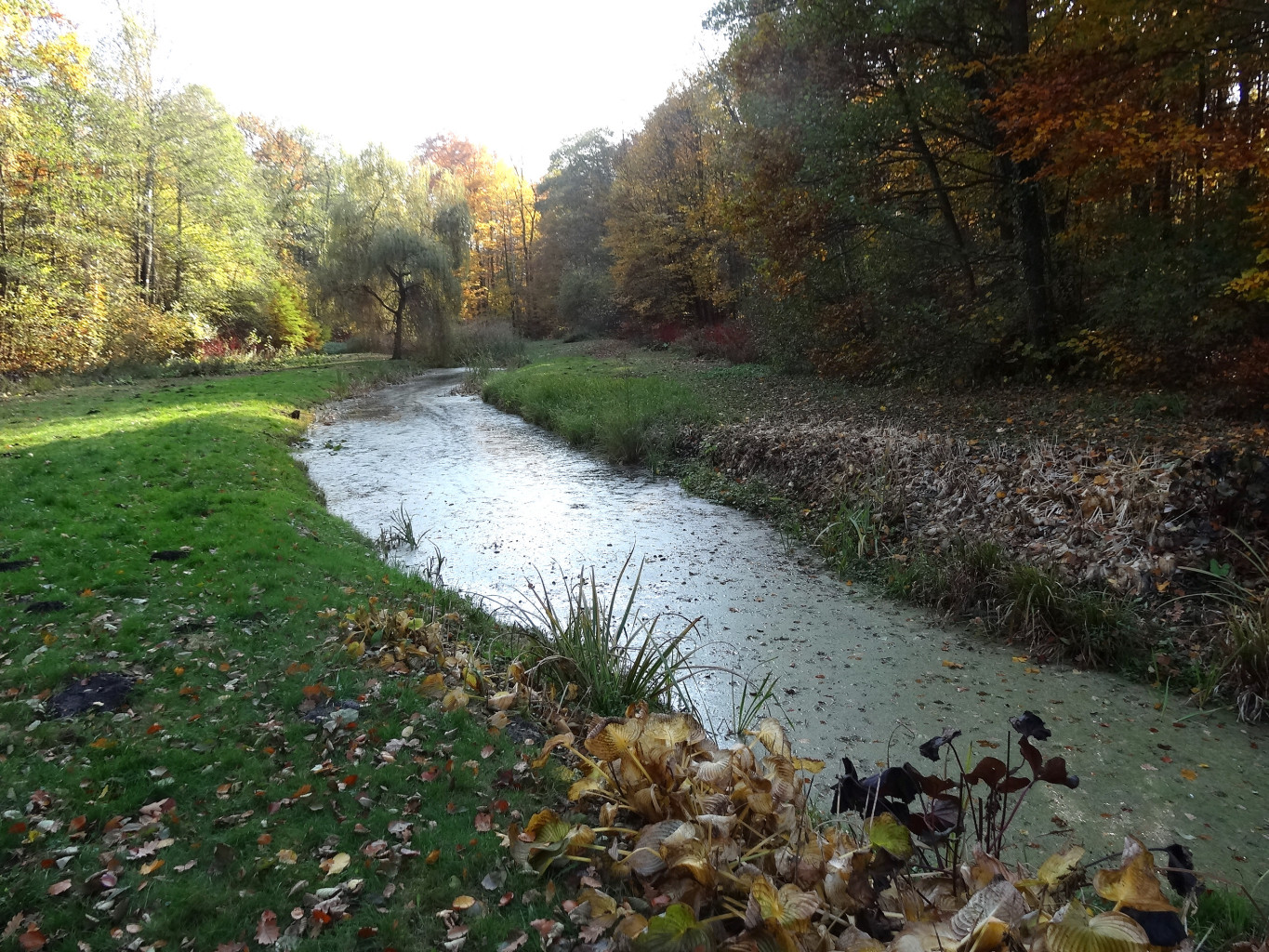
Upper stream

== See also ==
- Ostromecko
- Bydgoszcz
- Andrzej Szwalbe

== Bibliography ==
- (in Polish) Praca zbiorowa (2011). Encyklopedia Bydgoszczy. Bydgoszcz: Towarzystwo Miłośników Miasta Bydgoszczy. p. 314. ISBN 978-83-926423-6-7.
- (in Polish) Kaja, Renata (2002). Przewodnik po zespołach pałacowych i dworskich. Bydgoszcz: Wydawniczo-Promocyjna Agencja Duo-Press. pp. 132–140. ISBN 83-87419-76-1.
- (in Polish) Trzebuchowska, Magdalena (2014). Park w Ostromecku. Kalendarz Bydgoski. Bydgoszcz: Towarzystwo Miłośników Miasta Bydgoszczy. pp. 39–40. ISBN 978-83-87419-76-9.
- (in Polish) Raszeja, Zdzisław (2002). Ostromecko i okolice. Bydgoszcz: Wydawnictwo Margrafsen. p. s. ISBN 83-87070-78-5.
- (in Polish) Okoń, E. (2001). Ostromecko w XVIII stuleciu. Kalendarz Bydgoski. Bydgoszcz: Towarzystwo Miłośników Miasta Bydgoszczy. pp. 199–203.
- (in Polish) Perlińska, Anna (1991). Jeszcze raz o Ostromecku i jego właścicielach. Kalendarz Bydgoski. Bydgoszcz: Towarzystwo Miłośników Miasta Bydgoszczy. pp. 231–235.
- (in Polish) Stankiewicz, M. (2004). Pałac sztuk. Kalendarz Bydgoski. Bydgoszcz: Towarzystwo Miłośników Miasta Bydgoszczy. pp. 275–277.
- (in Polish) Grzybowska-Łukaszek, Ewa (1990). Ostromecko–bydgoski Wilanów(?). Kalendarz Bydgoski. Bydgoszcz: Towarzystwo Miłośników Miasta Bydgoszczy. pp. 109–114.
