= Cienski family with Pomian coat of arms =

Pomian coat of arms

Cienski family with Pomian coat of arms (Polish: Cieńscy herbu Pomian) is a Polish noble family, belonging to the heraldic Clan of Pomian.

The surname comes from the name of the ancestral village in Poland. During the 18th and 20th centuries, they were heirs to large estates in Galicia. According to Seweryn Uruski, the Cienski family with Pomian coat of arms is of the same origin as the Łubieński family.

== History ==
The Cienski family has been known since the 15th century.
