= Dziedzic =

Dziedzic is a Polish surname referring to the placename Dziedzice, which in turn is derived from the word dziedzic ("heir", "successor"). Notable people with the surname include:

- Augustyn Dziedzic (1928–2008), Polish weightlifter
- Janusz Dziedzic (born 1980), Polish footballer
- Joe Dziedzic (born 1971), American ice hockey player
- Jonathan Dziedzic (born 1991), American baseball player
- Kari Dziedzic (1962–2024), American politician
- Katarzyna Dziedzic, Canadian model and beauty pageant titleholder
- Stanley Dziedzic (born 1949), American wrestler
- Stefan Dziedzic (1927–2006), Polish alpine skier
- Walt Dziedzic (1932–2018), American politician
