= Dziedzice =

Dziedzice may refer to the following places:

- Dziedzice, Greater Poland Voivodeship (west-central Poland)
- Dziedzice, Masovian Voivodeship (east-central Poland)
- Dziedzice, Krapkowice County in Opole Voivodeship (south-west Poland)
- Dziedzice, Namysłów County in Opole Voivodeship (south-west Poland)
- Dziedzice, West Pomeranian Voivodeship (north-west Poland)
- Czechowice-Dziedzice in Silesian Voivodeship
