= Głuchowo, Kuyavian-Pomeranian Voivodeship =

Głuchowo
- Village
- Location within Poland
- Coordinates: 53°12′27″N 18°33′8″E
- Country: Poland
- Voivodeship: Kuyavian-Pomeranian
- County: Toruń
- Gmina: Chełmża

Głuchowo [ɡwuˈxɔvɔ] is a village in the administrative district of Gmina Chełmża, within Toruń County, Kuyavian-Pomeranian Voivodeship, in north-central Poland.
