= Pomian coat of arms =

Polish coat of arms

Pomian
- Battle cry: Pomian, Nowiny
- Alternative names: Bawola Głowa, Pomianowicz, Proporczyk
- Earliest mention: 1306
- Towns: none
- Families: 239 names A Abramowicz, Awedyk. B Bagniewski, Bartoszewicz, Besiekierski, Białłozor, Białosuknia, Biernacki, Biesiekierski, Biesierski, Bławdziewicz, Boczkowski, Bogatkiewicz, Bogatko, Bohatko, Bossuta, Brajczewski, Brajszewski, Broniszewski, Broniuszyc, Brudzewski, Brzączewski, Brzechowski, Brzozowski, Brzuchowski, Bukaty, Butkiewicz, Byczkowski. C Chaliński, Charłupski, Chartłupski, Chebda, Chmielewski, Ciasnowski, Cieński, Ciesnowski, Ciołkowicz, Ciosnowski, Czapiewski, Czyński. D Danowski, Derszkow, Derewojed, Derwojed, Dłużniewski, Dziembowski, Dziębowski, Dziurkowski. G Gajdamowicz, Giedmin, Giedwicz, Gliński, Gobiata, Górski, Grabieński, Grabiński, Grabski. H Hancewicz, Haniewski, Harasimowicz, Harasymowicz, Hebda, Hejnisz, Henclewski, Horzyk, Humel. I Izdebski. J Janczowski, Janczyński, Jarand, Jarunt, Jatowt, Jatowtowicz, Jażwiński, Juraha, Juranda. K Kaczkowski, Kaczyński, Kamieniecki, Kanuszewicz, Kasiński, Kasparowicz, Kempalski, Kępalski, Kęsowski, Kielc, Kiełczewski, Kłobski, Kłopotowski, Kobierzycki, Kojdecki, Kolkowski, Kołucki, Kołudzki, Komaradzki, Komeradzki, Komierowski, Komirowski, Komoradzki, Kontowt, Kopczewski, Kosiński, Kośmider, Kotowski, Kozieradzki, Kraśniewski, Krosiński, Krukowiecki, Kruszyński. L Leszyński, Lewiński, Linowski, Linkowski, Lubomeski, Lubomęski, Lubomski, Lubomyski, Lubomyślski. Ł Łaszko, Ławecki, Ławski, Łubieński, Łubiński. M Makowecki, Makowiecki, Malawko, Malawski, Maławski, Mieliski, Mieliwski, Milewski, Miller, Misiecki, Molawko, Motylewski, Motylowski. N Nagrodzki, Netarbowski, Nieczatowski, Niehielewicz, Nietuchowski, Niewiesz, Nieżychowski, Nosiłowski, Nowak, Nowowiejski. O Olszewski, Osiecki, Osiński, Ossuchowski, Ostromęcki, Otorowski. P Pezarski, Peżarski, Pieniążek, Pietkiewicz, Pietkowski, Pietrusiewicz, Pietruszewicz, Pięta, Piętka, Piętkowicz, Piętkowski, Piotrkowski, Piskowski, Plinkowski, Płomikowski, Płomkowicki, Płomkowski, Płonkowski, Pogajewski, Pohajewski, Poklatecki, Pokłatecki, Pokubiała, Pokubiało, Pomian, Pomiankowski, Pomianowski, Popkowski, Popokowski, Pożerski, Prosiński, Proszyński, Przebojewski, Przybojewski, Przybranowski, Przystanowski, Psarski, Puklatecki, Pułaski, Purzecki. R Rabczewski, Racieski, Racięcki, Racięski, Radecki, Radziszewski, Rapczewski, Rąbieski, Rąbiewski, Ruchocki. S Sacewicz, Saczewicz, Sagajłło, Sagajło, Sagayło, Sągajło, Serafinowicz, Siciński, Sierzpiński, Skubarczewski, Sobieszowski, Sokołowski, Srzednicki, Stachiewicz, Stynwacki, Sulek, Sulewski, Suligowski, Suski, Swierzewski, Swolkień, Syciński, Szczepanski. Ś Śwerzewski. T Toltzig. W Warzymowski, Werpowicz, Wędziagolski, Wichrowski, Wiesienicki, Wietrzychowski, Wilkostowski, Wolski z Kozioł. Z Zachnowicz, Zagajewski, Zakrzewski, Zdanowski, Zdebski, Zdunowski, Zdzenicki, Zdzienicki, Zembrzycki, Zerosławski, Zubrzycki. Ż Żerosławski, Żyłło.

Pomian is a Polish coat of arms. It was used by several szlachta families in the times of the Polish–Lithuanian Commonwealth.

== History ==
On the shield is the black head of a bison on a yellow field, with a sword driven into the head so that both the top and the bottom of the sword are visible. Above the helmet on the crown is an arm in armor with a bare hand holding a sword.

The origin of this coat-of-arms can be traced back to 1279, when Hebda, brother of Jaranda, performed public deeds of merit to atone for the sins of his murdered brother. One of his brave acts was the killing of a bison that had been plaguing the village of Lubania. During the reign of Walter II, King of Poland, the bison head was placed on the shield and the arm with a sword was placed above the crown and was named Pomian. This is a communal coat-of-arms and is shared by other Great Polish Families.

== Blazon ==
The Pomian coat of arms, being borne by multiple families, as with most Polish armorial bearings, has multiple variations to the basic design. The example image on this page may be blazoned as follows:
Arms: Or, a buffalo's head caboshed, sable, pierced with a sword, proper. Mantling: Sable, doubled Or. Crest: Out of a ducal coronet, an arm embowed in armor holding in its hand a sword, proper.

== Notable bearers ==
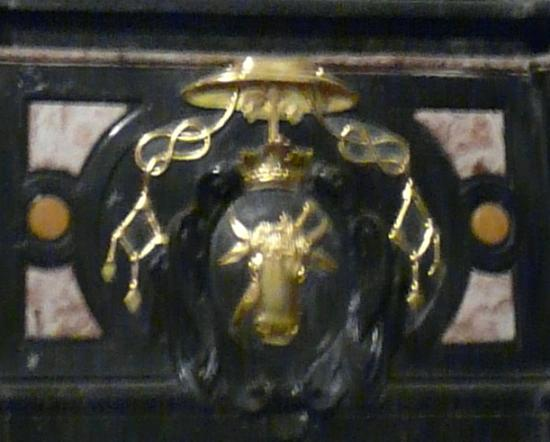
Pomian coat of arms in the burial monument of Mathias Lubienski (Maciej Łubieński), Primate of Poland and Interrex of the Polish–Lithuanian commonwealth, inside Gniezno Cathedral

Notable bearers of this coat of arms include:

- Bohdan Andrejewicz Sakowicz
- Alfred Niezychowski
- Stanislaw Kobierzycki, Kasztelan Gdański, Author and Historian, Gdansk, Poland b.1600-d.1665.
- Wladyslaw Aleksander Lubienski, Primate of Poland
- Swietoslaw Jana Kobierzycki, Canon Cathedral Plock.
- Zophia Kobierzycka, consort to Stefan Czarniecki.
- Mykhailo Zubrytskyi, Ukrainian historian and Greek Catholic priest.
- Krzysztof Kosinski, Polish Noble and leader of Kosinski Uprising.
- Maciej Łubieński, Primate of Poland and Interrex
- Feliks Lubienski, Justice Minister in the Grand Duchy of Warsaw
- Tomasz Lubienski, General and industrialist
- Bernard Łubieński, Redemptorist preacher and missionary
- Lech Kaczyński
- Rula Lenska, actor
- Tadeusz Cieński, senator
- Jan Cieński, bishop
- Kazimierz Łubieński, bishop

== See also ==
- Polish heraldry
- Heraldry
- Coat of arms

== Sources ==
- Dynastic Genealogy
- Ornatowski.com
