= Fordon Vistula Gorge =

Microregion in northern Poland

Fordon Vistula Gorge Fordoński Przełom Wisły (Polish)
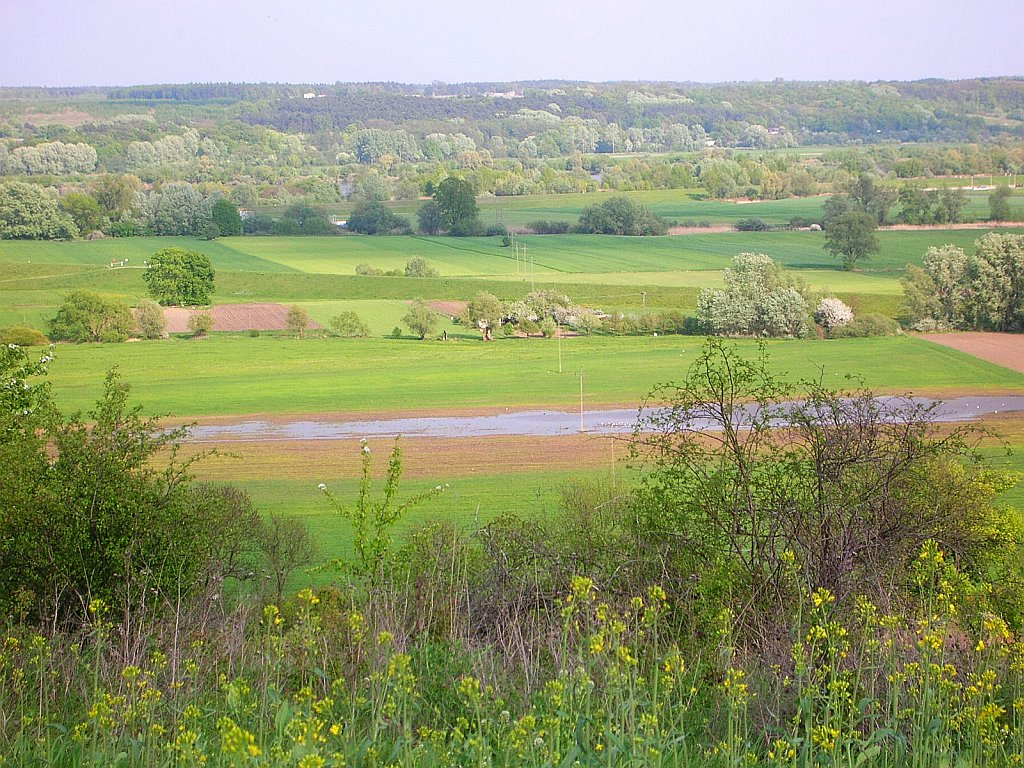
- Country: Poland
- Voivodeship: Kuyavian–Pomeranian Voivodeship
- Province: North European Plain
- Subprovince: South Baltic Lake Lands
- Macroregion: Lower Vistula Valley
- Mesoregion: Fordon Valley

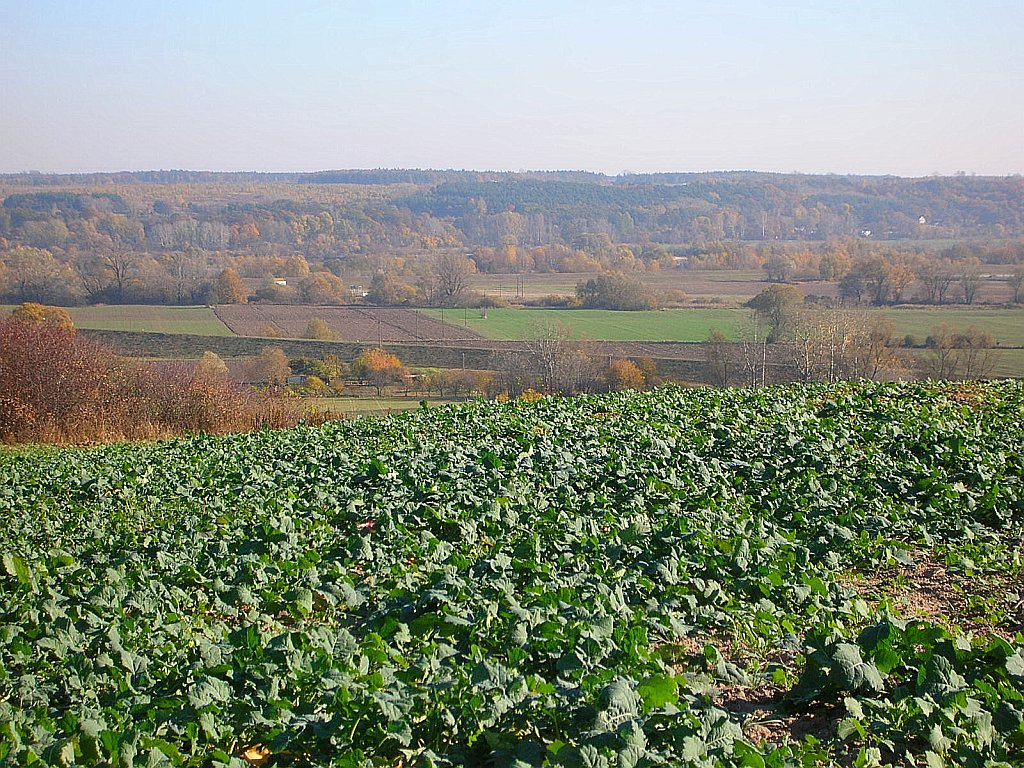
Autumn view in Jarużyn

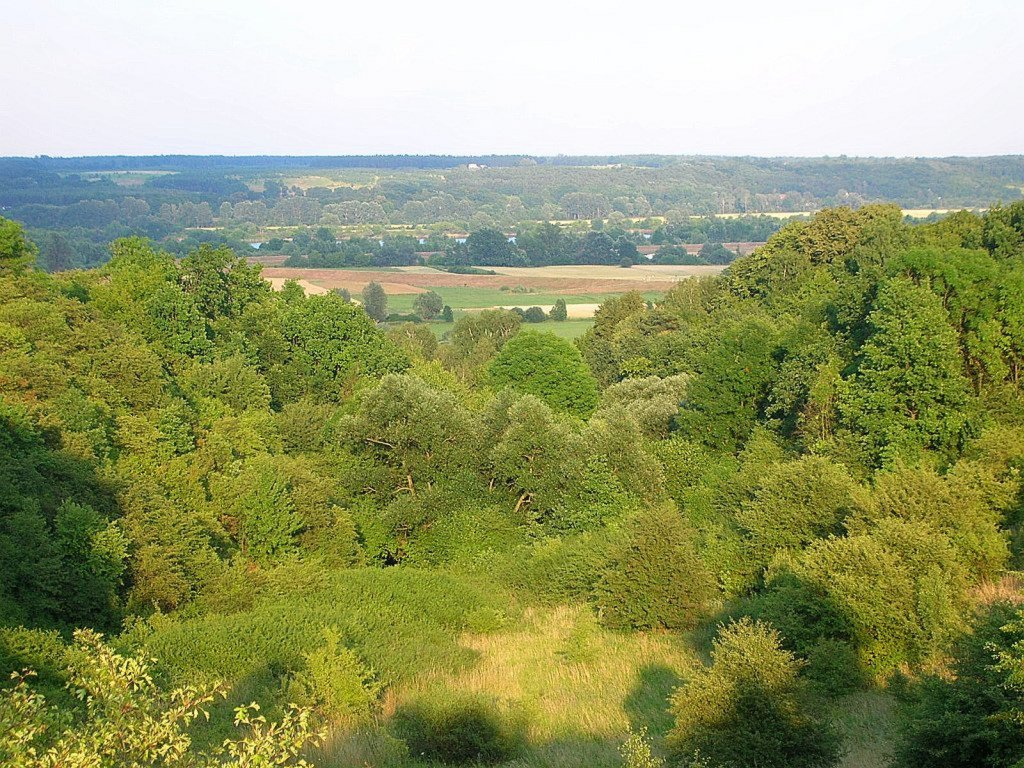
View from the Prodnia viewpoint

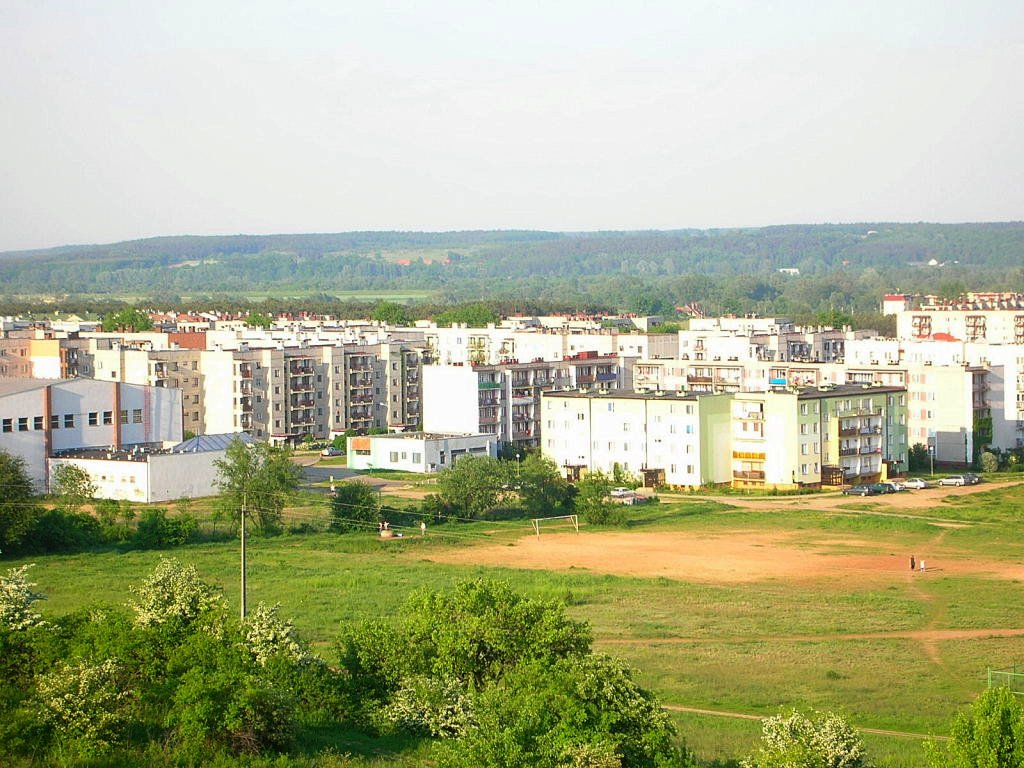
Buildings of Tatrzańskie district against the slope of the Fordon Valley

The Fordon Vistula Gorge, also known as the Vistula Valley Gorge or Fordon Gate, is a microregion in northern Poland, located in the northeastern part of Bydgoszcz, bordering the gminas of Osielsko, Dobrcz, and Dąbrowa Chełmińska. It forms the southern edge of the Lower Vistula Valley.

In the work Środowisko przyrodnicze Bydgoszczy (Natural Environment of Bydgoszcz), the Fordon Vistula Gorge is defined as a physical-geographical microregion within the mesoregion of the Fordon Valley. Broadly, it encompasses the so-called gate of the gorge section of the lower Vistula, where the river, after flowing through the Toruń-Eberswalde Urstromtal, sharply changes direction, cutting into the South Baltic Lake Lands and heading directly toward the Baltic Sea.

== Geological history ==
The formation of the gorge section of the Vistula valley below Fordon is linked to the development of the drainage system around Bydgoszcz at the transition from the Upper Plenivistulian to the Late Glacial period. At the end of the last glaciation, as the ice front retreated across northern Poland, meltwaters from northern outwash plains of rivers such as the Skrwa, Drwęca, Brda, Wda, and Gwda merged with waters flowing from the south, forming a massive proto-Vistula current. This current carved an urstromtal several kilometers wide, flowing westward toward the North Sea. The lower Vistula gorge occurred when these waters found a shorter outlet, redirecting flow through a tunnel valley in the lower Powiśle region, which concealed a buried valley from earlier geological epochs.

The formation of the Lower Vistula Valley and the redirection of glacial waters occurred in a three-stage process. The classical explanation is based on analyzing fluvial terrace systems and their ages in the southern part of the valley (Grudziądz Basin and Fordon Valley), where a complete nine-level terrace system is preserved. However, newer studies suggest that the terrace model does not fully explain the valley's formation. Evidence indicates that dead ice also played a role, with some presumed terrace levels having a kame origin.

=== Proglacial phase ===
During the proglacial phase, primarily associated with the Pomeranian phase, meltwaters, after depositing outwash plain fields, formed valleys within them, flowing south toward the developing Toruń-Eberswalde Urstromtal. In the braided flow of the urstromtal, meltwaters mixed with southern Polish river waters, heading westward. From Chełmno to Fordon, an outwash plain valley of the Wda and Mątawa rivers formed, channeling meltwaters from the Tuchola outwash plain. This valley evolved into a proglacial valley, serving as the initial form for the Fordon Vistula gorge. According to R. Galon, meltwater drainage southward to the Toruń-Eberswalde Urstromtal occurred at the level of terraces IX–XI (83–86 m above sea level). This southern drainage likely persisted during the Pomeranian phase, as indicated by the development of the Wda and Mątawa outwash plains.

=== Transitional phase ===
Following the retreat of the ice sheet from the Pomeranian phase to northern Pomerania and the southern Baltic Sea, the second developmental phase, known as the bifurcation phase, began. During this period, some glacial waters near Fordon, at the level of the high terrace IX (60–61 m above sea level), likely during a flood surge, redirected into the proglacial valley near Chełmno and began flowing north toward the Gdańsk Bay. The trigger for this redirection was the melting of dead ice buried in the glacial deposits of this tunnel valley.

Although the Wda outwash plain valley was utilized by some Vistula waters, most continued flowing westward through the Toruń-Eberswalde Urstromtal. Researchers date the start of the bifurcation phase to 14,000–12,000 years ago. According to R. Galon, the bifurcating waters flowed at the levels of terraces IX, VIII, and VII (50–61 m above sea level), lasting about 1,000 years. Newer studies indicate that bifurcation from the Toruń Basin occurred only at terraces VIII and VII. The initial northward river flow from the Toruń Basin occurred at a terrace level 30–32 m above the current Vistula level (58–60 m above sea level).

=== Baltic phase ===
The third phase of the valley's development occurred when the ice sheet was confined to Scandinavia. The valley's formation was driven by a low erosion base (the level of the emerging Baltic Sea), leading to rapid vertical erosion of the valley and the cessation of westward flow in favor of a shorter northeastern route to the Baltic Ice Lake. As a result, the Brda waters entered the abandoned urstromtal between Jachcice and Brdyujście, carving new fluvial terrace edges. Intense vertical erosion of the urstromtal floor in Bydgoszcz correlated with the lowering Vistula level. A drainage divide formed between Bydgoszcz and Nakło nad Notecią, separating the Oder and Vistula river systems, while the urstromtal west of Bydgoszcz became swampy and peat-filled.

The exclusive northward flow of the Vistula occurred 12,000–11,000 years ago, during a warmer interstadial period, at a terrace level 16–17 m above the current Vistula level. This is evidenced by the presence of this terrace along the lower Vistula, absent in the urstromtal west of the Brda.

The further development of the Lower Vistula Valley is reflected in the formation of the terrace system from VI to I. Initially, rapid valley deepening occurred due to the low erosion base of the Baltic (Yoldia Sea, Ancylus Lake, 10,000–8,000 years ago), followed by predominant river accumulation during the Littorina Sea period (8,000–4,000 years ago), which deposited an alluvial cover up to 20 m thick on the valley floor.

== Characteristics ==
The Fordon Vistula Gorge is a physical-geographical microregion encompassing the Vistula valley floor, stretching approximately 12 km from Fordon to the Unisław Basin (line Kozielec–Czarże), including preserved terrace levels. The river divides it into two parts: the left bank forms the Strzelce Plain (named after Strzelce Dolne), and the right bank forms the Rafa Plain (314.831.02, named after Rafa).

Due to their similar landscape origins, both units share many characteristics. They are mostly flat, rising 2–3 m above the river's average water level, composed of sands interlayered with gravel, locally with silts, clays, and peat lenses. Fertile fluvisols and, in places, peat-muck soils cover the surface. These are Holocene river accumulation deposits overlying sandy Last Interglacial sediments or directly on Tertiary formations. The modern valley floor results from erosion-accumulation processes in the late Weichselian glaciation and Holocene, tied to the formation of the Lower Vistula Valley. Over the past few thousand years, river accumulation has dominated, raising the floodplain level by 4–5 m.

A distinctive feature of the Fordon Vistula Gorge is the high groundwater level, at a depth of 1–1.5 m. The valley floor is flooded during high water events, with oxbow lakes prominent in the landscape. The valley is primarily used for agriculture and meadows. Natural riparian forests and willow thickets are preserved in fragments along the Vistula's inter-dyke zone. Rural buildings are sparse, located on elevated areas such as fluvial terraces, former riverbanks, or small aeolian hills.

The Strzelce Plain, on the left (western) Vistula bank, is more anthropogenically altered, with willow and willow-poplar forests limited to a narrow strip along the river and near oxbow lakes.

The Rafa Plain, on the right (eastern) bank, retains a more natural character, lacking embankments and preserving larger areas of riparian forests, some protected in the Wielka Kępa Nature Reserve. Extensive riparian forests and thickets are also found northwest of Rafa.

== See also ==
- Lower Vistula Valley
