= Fordon Valley =

Geographical region in Poland

Fordon Valley (physical-geographical unit no. 314.83) is a mesoregion in northern Poland, forming the southern part of the Lower Vistula Valley.

== Location ==
According to the National Atlas of Poland (1978), the Fordon Valley borders:

- to the north: Grudziądz Basin (314.82),
- to the west: Świecie Plateau (314.73),
- to the south: Toruń Basin (315.25),
- to the east: Chełmno Lakeland (315.31).

The mesoregion lies entirely within the Kuyavian-Pomeranian Voivodeship and is named after Fordon, a former town now a district of Bydgoszcz.

== Geological history ==
The Fordon Valley was formed about 12,000 years ago when the flow direction of the Proto-Vistula changed from westward in the Toruń-Eberswalde Urstromtal to northeastward. The initial form of the valley and the Fordon Vistula Gorge was a sandur valley of the rivers Wda and Mątawa, later transformed into a proglacial valley and finally used as an outflow path for urstromtal waters toward the Baltic Sea.

== Geomorphology ==
The Fordon Valley stretches approximately 40 km from the Toruń Basin to the Grudziądz Basin, covering about 260 km^{2}.

It begins where the river leaves the Toruń-Eberswalde Urstromtal (Notec-Warta basin) into its lower course along the boundary line considered as Fordon–Ostromecko, and ends below Chełmno and Świecie near the line Sartowice–Podwiesk. This segment shows contrasting changes in width. After the Fordon narrowing, about 3 km wide, the valley widens distinctly into a meander basin called the Unisław Basin, reaching widths up to 9 km. Then it narrows near Starogród, Kuyavian-Pomeranian Voivodeship to 5–6 km, before widening again (about 7 km) near the mouths of the side tributaries of the Vistula: Fryba near Chełmno on the right bank and Wda (Black Water) near Świecie on the left bank. These are called the Chełmno and Świecie Basins.

The Chełmno-Świecie widening is genetically different from the Unisław Basin, reflected in their differing overall appearances and relief structures. The Unisław Basin formed due to lateral erosion of a Vistula meander, whereas the Świecie and Chełmno Basins formed through the widening of the main valley by side valleys.

Clear terrace system fragments remain in the Fordon Valley floor, allowing connection with terraces in the Toruń Basin.

== Characteristics ==
The mesoregion's boundaries are morphological. Because the Fordon Escarpment belongs to the Świecie Plateau, the Fordon Valley includes the Vistula valley floor along with preserved terrace fragments. The current valley floor formed during the Late Glacial and Holocene erosion-accumulation processes, meaning it developed in several stages. In recent millennia, accumulation processes predominate, raising the floodplain level by about 4–5 meters.

The valley floor consists of river alluvium with nine terrace levels; dunes and oxbow lakes (water-filled or peat-filled) are also present. The valley is protected from frequent Vistula floods by flood embankments.

The right bank near Chełmno is deeply incised by ravines; exposures on steep slopes allow reconstruction of the Lower Vistula region's history during the last glaciation. Particularly picturesque hills above the river course can be found near Kozielec and Świecie (Devil's Mountains, Wiąskie Mountains, Devil Mountains).

The valley floor is used for arable land and meadows and has scattered settlements. Fertile river alluvium averaging 2–3 meters thick covers Holocene river deposits on sandy sediments from the Eemian interglacial or directly on Tertiary formations (sands, silts, clays).

Near Ostromecko, Rafa, and Chełmno fragments of riparian forests with poplar, oak, elm, ash, and alder remain, partially protected in nature reserves.

=== Towns ===
The Fordon Valley covers parts of the municipalities of Bydgoszcz, Dąbrowa Chełmińska, Dobrcz, Unisław, Pruszcz, Kijewo Królewskie, Świecie, and Chełmno. The main urban center is Bydgoszcz (Fordon district). The town of Świecie is located on a terrace near the mouth of the Wda, one of the older Pomeranian towns, captured in 1309 by the Teutonic Knights who built a castle there. Fordon, incorporated into Bydgoszcz in 1973, was a castellany stronghold in the 12th century. It is connected by the road-rail bridge with the village of Ostromecko on the right bank of the Vistula, where there is an exploited source of alkaline water and the historic Ostromecko Palace and Park Complex of the Mostowski and Alvensleben families.

=== Valley of Death (Bydgoszcz) ===
Valley of Death (Polish: Dolina Śmierci) in Fordon, Bydgoszcz, northern Poland, is a site of Nazi German mass murder committed at the beginning of World War II and a mass grave of 1,200–1,400 Poles and Jews murdered in October and November 1939 by the local German Selbstschutz and the Gestapo.

=== Division into microregions ===
T. Gacki and J. Szukalski in the work "Lower Vistula Valley" distinguished six microregions within the valley floor:

- Left bank:
  - Świecie microregion – flood terrace south of the Wda River mouth to the Świecie Plateau near Kozielec,
  - Kozielec microregion – on the valley slope,
  - Fordon microregion – at the narrowing in the area of Fordon district of Bydgoszcz.
- Right bank:
  - Ostromecko microregion – opposite Fordon,
  - Kokocki microregion – flood terrace along the Vistula protected by embankments,
  - Brucki microregion (named after the village Bruki) – on the higher terrace step in the Unisław escarpment bend.

In the work "Natural Environment of Bydgoszcz", two microregions were distinguished in the southern part of the mesoregion (Bydgoszcz area):

- Fordon Vistula Gorge (314.831), divided into the Strzelecka Plain and Rafa Plain,
- Słońce Terrace (314.832).

== Nature protection ==
The Fordon Valley is part of the Chełmno and Nadwiślański Landscape Parks complex and two Natura 2000 sites:

- Lower Vistula Valley PLB04003,
- Solecka Vistula Valley PLH04003.

Among the nature reserves in the mesoregion are:

- Wielka Kępa Nature Reserve,
- Ostrów Panieński Nature Reserve,
- Łęgi na Ostrowiu Panieńskim Nature Reserve.

More reserves occur on the valley slopes, which belong to neighboring regions: the Świecie Plateau and Chełmno Lakeland.

Noteworthy are the reserves protecting steppe vegetation on valley slopes: Płutowo Nature Reserve, Zbocza Płutowskie Nature Reserve, Mount St. Lawrence Nature Reserve and the forest Las Mariański Nature Reserve.

== Gallery ==
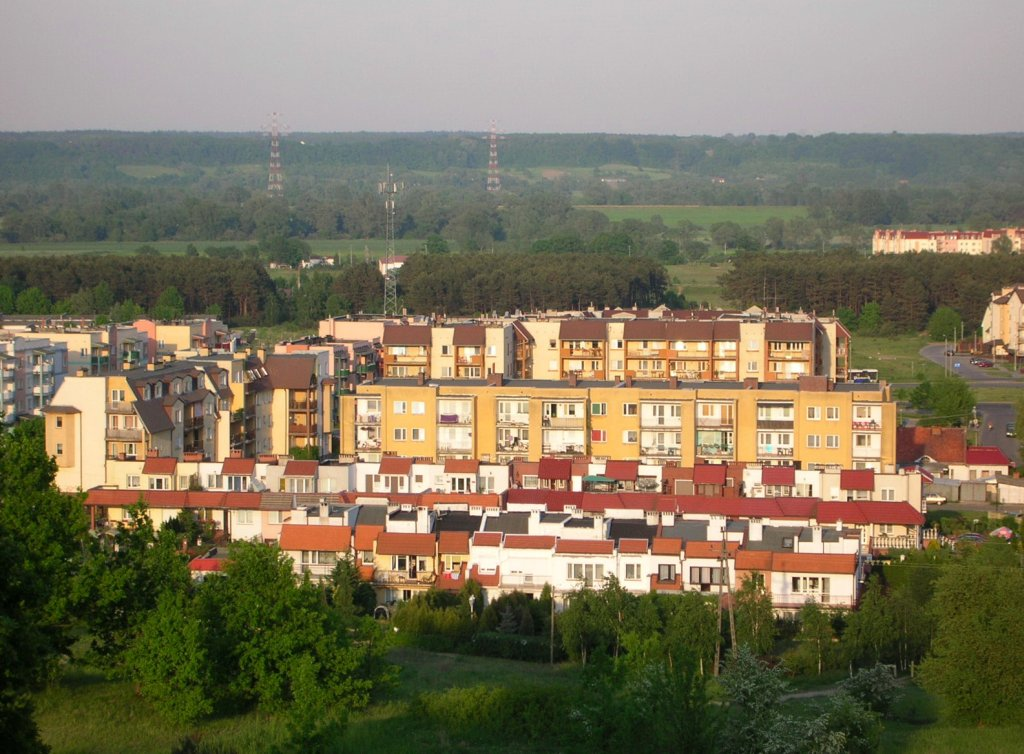
Tatrzańskie Housing Estate in the Fordon district against the backdrop of the Marian Hills of the Fordon Valley

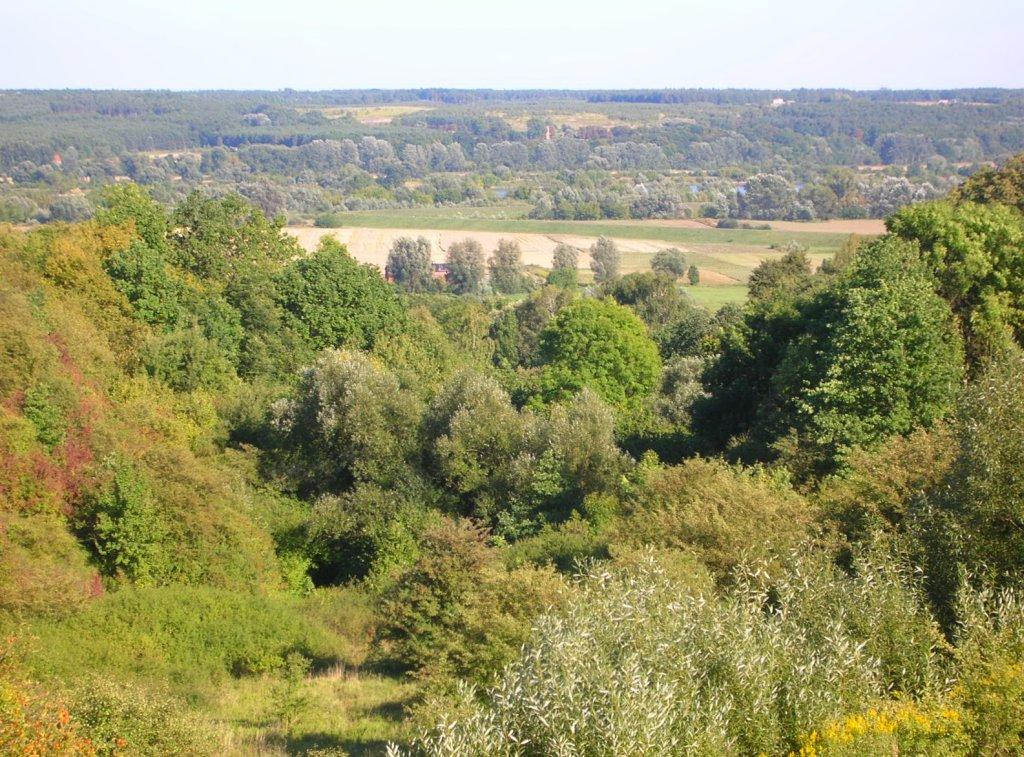
The valley seen from the Prodnia glade in Jarużyn

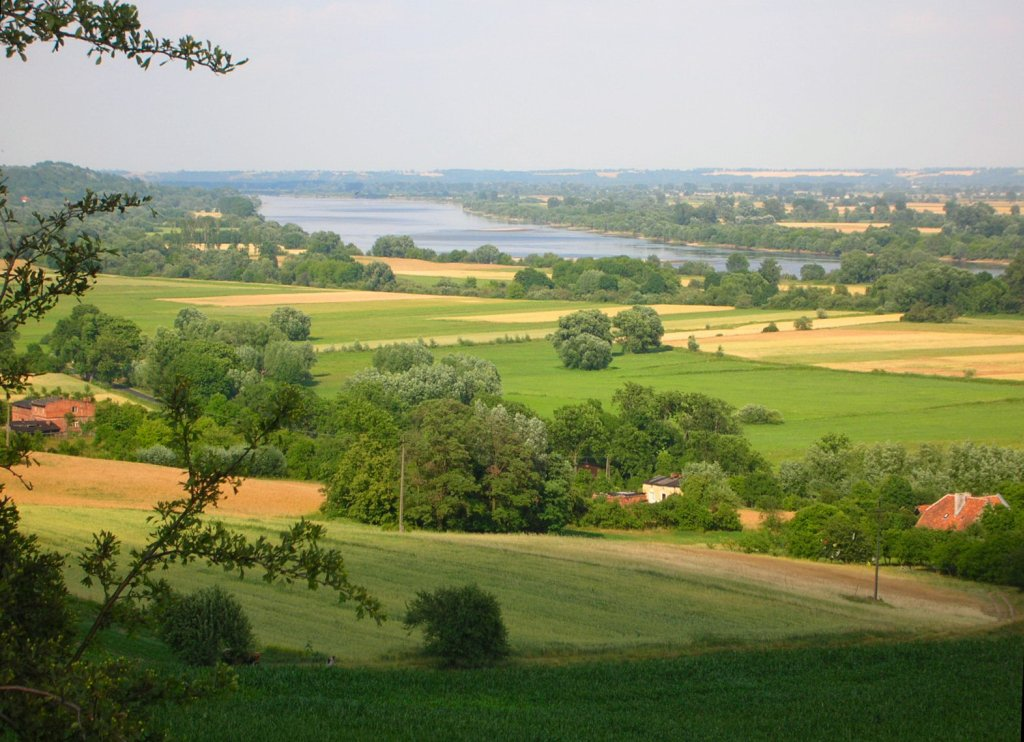
Vistula Valley visible from the summit of the Slavic hillfort in Strzelce Dolne

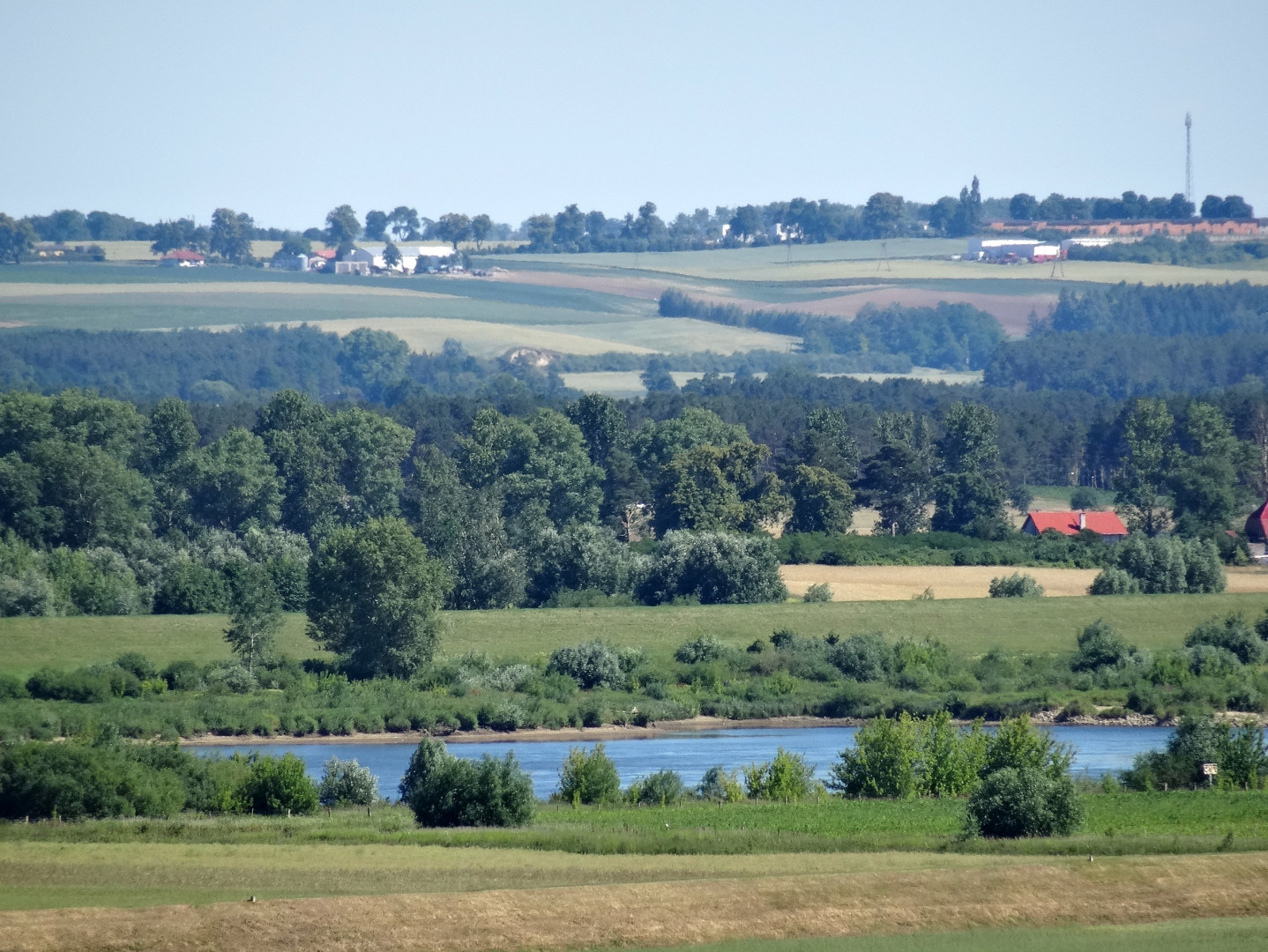
View of the eastern slope of the Unisław Basin from the Talerzyk hillfort near Topolno

== Bibliography ==
- Dolina Dolnej Wisły. Wydawnictwo Polskiej Akademii Nauk 1982. Ossolineum, Wrocław-Warszawa-Kraków-Gdańsk-Łódź, pp. 61-79. ISBN 83-04-00699-5
- Kondracki, Jerzy. Geografia regionalna Polski. 3rd revised edition, Wydawnictwo Naukowe PWN, Warsaw 2009. ISBN 978-83-01-16022-7
