= Gzin =

- Village
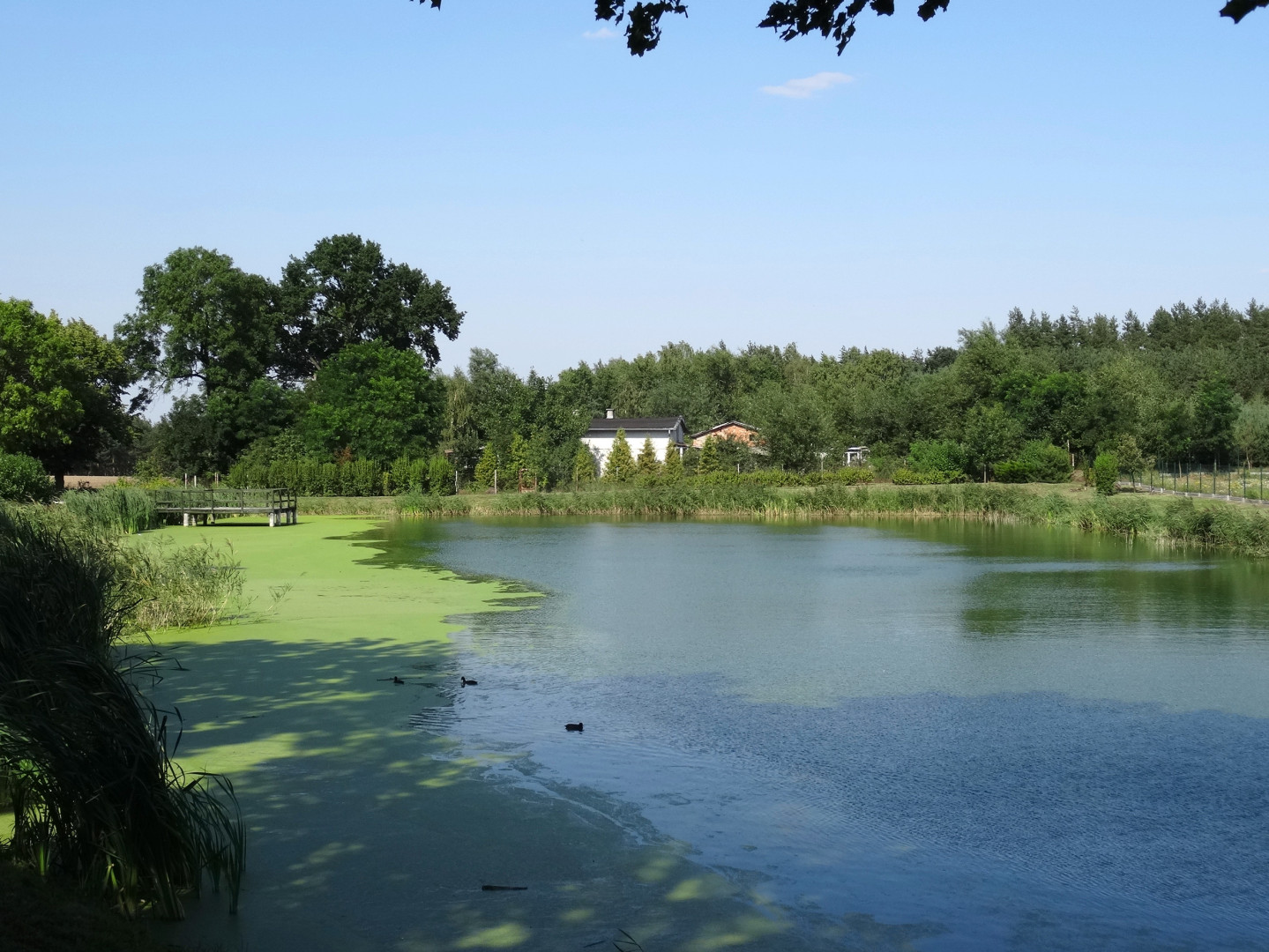
- Pond in Gzin

- Location within Poland
- Coordinates: 53°13′N 18°19′E
- Country: Poland
- Voivodeship: Kuyavian-Pomeranian
- County: Bydgoszcz
- Gmina: Dąbrowa Chełmińska
- First mentioned: 1222
- Population: 450
- Time zone: UTC+1 (CET)
  - Summer (DST): UTC+2 (CEST)
- Vehicle registration: CBY
- Website: http://dabrowachelminska.pl/

Gzin [ɡʑin] is a village in the administrative district of Gmina Dąbrowa Chełmińska, within Bydgoszcz County, Kuyavian-Pomeranian Voivodeship, in north-central Poland. It is located in the Chełmno Land in the historic region of Pomerania.

== History ==
The oldest known mention of the village comes from a document of Duke Konrad I of Masovia from 1222.

During the German occupation (World War II), in 1939, inhabitants of Gzin were among the victims of massacres of Poles committed by the German Selbstschutz in nearby Płutowo as part of the Intelligenzaktion.
