= Lower Vistula Valley =

Valley in northern Poland

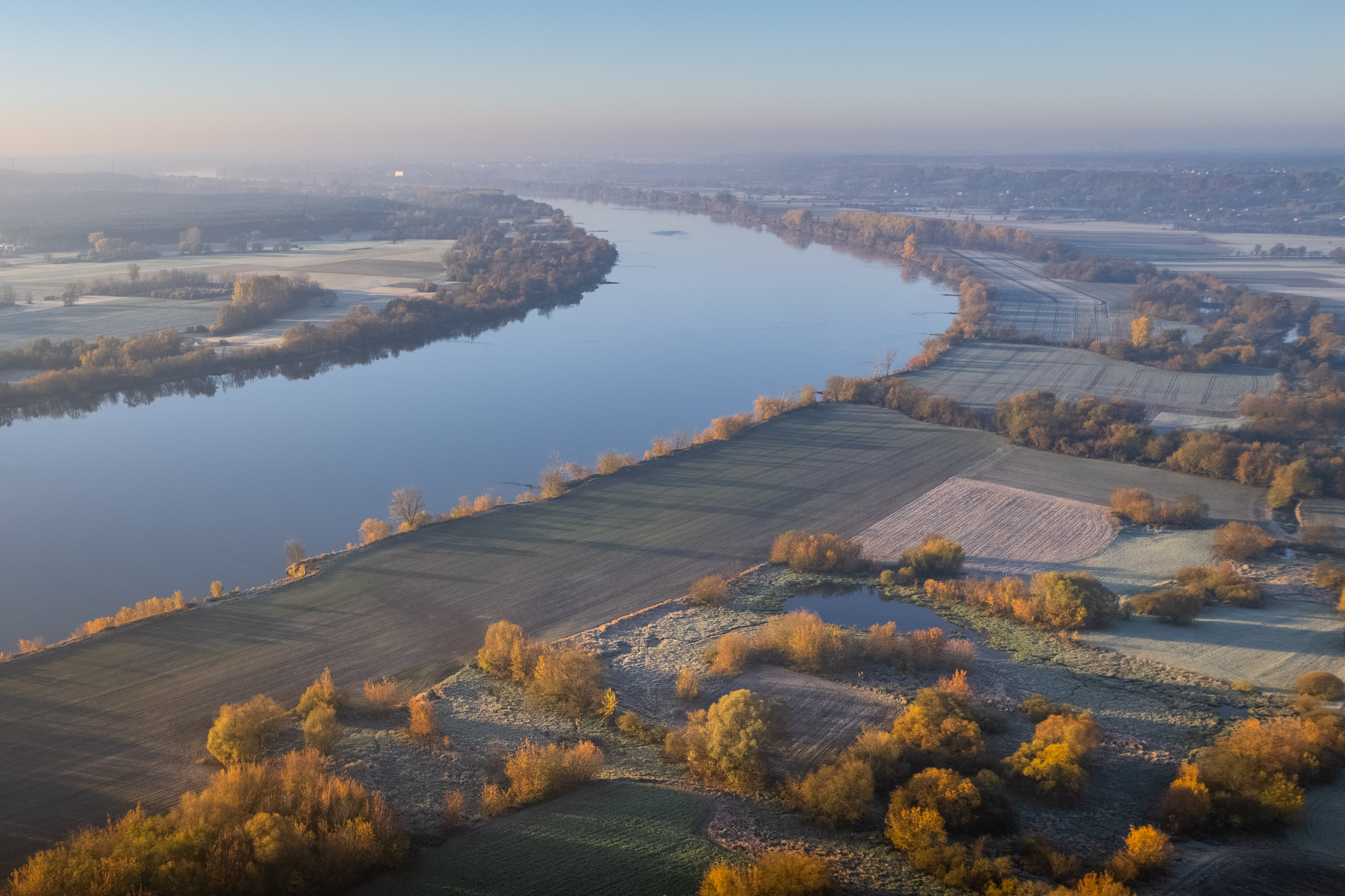
Lower Vistula Valley

Lower Vistula Valley (Polish: Dolina Dolnej Wisły; physical-geographical region code 314.8) is a geographical region and a macroregion in northern Poland, comprising the valley of the Vistula River from the Toruń-Eberswalde Urstromtal near Bydgoszcz to the delta area near Gniew.

== Characteristics ==
The Lower Vistula Valley belongs to the South Baltic Lakelands subprovince and is genetically and landscape-wise distinct within it. The wide valley cuts through the lakeland uplands forming a breakthrough valley between the Toruń-Eberswalde Urstromtal and the Vistula Delta plain.

The drainage of Vistula waters to the Gdańsk Bay depression was formed after the retreat of the glacier's front during the Pomeranian glacial phase. At that time, the proto-Vistula changed course northwards, creating a breakthrough near Bydgoszcz. The valley constriction near Fordon is a glacial channel later adopted by the river, and valley widenings correspond to extensive kettle hole depressions where dead ice blocks once existed.

From Bydgoszcz, where the Vistula leaves the glacial valley, to Gniew, below which the delta begins, the valley stretches for 120 km with widths varying from 3 to 18 km in the basin-like widenings. The narrowest width is 3 km in the Fordon breakthrough section, 18 km near Grudziądz, and 8 km near Kwidzyn. The most common valley width is 7–9 km.

Valley slopes reach relative heights of 50–70 m with inclines up to 50°. The upland surfaces adjacent to the upper valley edges lie at variable altitudes: in the Fordon Gate they rise above 90 m asl and generally fluctuate between 80 and 100 m northwards, descending near side valley mouths to about 60 m due to increased denudation. The valley slopes near former river meanders are steep, while others have been dissected by erosional side valleys and subjected to gravitational mass movements like landslides and slumps.

The average Vistula water level drops from 28 m asl near Fordon, 20 m near Świecie, 18 m in the Grudziądz Basin, 9 m near Gniew.

In the southern part of the valley, terrace systems are preserved best in the Grudziądz Basin with a full nine-level set. Inland dunes formed on all terraces except the floodplain terrace, reaching heights of up to several meters.

The Lower Vistula Valley includes three morphogenetic units:

- valley floor (flat area shaped by Vistula alluvium),
- slope zone,
- moraine upland.

The valley floor is characterized by a flat agricultural landscape dissected by a dense network of drainage canals. Remnants of riparian forests survive, and flood embankments shape the landscape. Numerous oxbow lakes exist, and inland dunes occur north of Chełmno.

Steep valley slopes are covered by mixed deciduous forests dominated by oak, hornbeam, maple, linden, and beech. Steepest slopes frequently collapse, creating landslides, e.g., near Sartowice. Along slopes and ridges, xerothermic shrubs and vegetation occur. Valley slopes are intersected by ravines formed by water erosion from springs, where populations of giant horsetail (*Equisetum telmateia*) are noted.

The slope zone transitions into moraine uplands, forming flat or rolling plains diversified by valleys, ravines, and kettle lakes from melting dead ice blocks. Mixed forests and coniferous woods with varied character dominate this zone.

The valley is divided into three mesoregions: Fordon Valley, Grudziądz Basin, and Kwidzyn Valley. Several valley widenings (basins) occur: Unisław Basin, Świecie-Chełmno Basin, and Grudziądz Basin, and constrictions including the Fordon Gorge.

== Geological history ==
The depression of Lower Pomerania, incised by the modern Lower Vistula Valley, relates to older fossil geomorphological surfaces developed on Cretaceous, Tertiary, South Polish glaciation (Mazovian interglacial), and Middle Polish glaciation (Eemian interglacial) sedimentary series.

The valley depression from the Eemian interglacial was covered by Baltic glaciation deposits but not fully erased. This allowed water overflow from the glacial valley northwards after glacier melting.

Dead ice masses remained in the Lower Vistula depression after Baltic glaciation retreat. During a glacier standstill along the Pomeranian marginal zone, the Vistula flowing westward in the Toruń-Eberswalde valley bifurcated at the glacial channel near Fordon–Chełmno line. The flow direction change northward below Fordon started about 12,000 years ago. Part of the flow was directed westward to the Notec-Warta valley system feeding the Oder River, and part north to the Baltic Sea. This bifurcation lasted through terraces IX to VI.

The low erosion base of the forming Baltic Sea (Litorina and Yoldia phases) caused rapid incision of the Fordon breakthrough valley and final loss of the western outflow in favor of northern drainage to the Baltic. Vistula's exclusive northern course started about 11,000 years ago.

When the Vistula broke through at Fordon and redirected north to Gdańsk Bay, it utilized and reshaped existing meltwater valleys, expanding and deepening them to the present shape.

After full glacier melting and Baltic Ocean connection, river erosion ceased, and alluvial sedimentation began. The river meandered, creating wide floodplains. The flow was braided and anastomosing, creating thick alluvial covers up to 18–20 m in the Grudziądz Basin.

== Settlement history ==
=== Prehistory ===
First traces of settlement date back to prehistoric times, with Paleolithic, Neolithic, and Bronze Age sites near Grudziądz. In the 6th and 5th centuries BC, Scythian raids occurred, likely crossing fords near Solec Kujawski and Fordon. Roman period influences came from the south (Przeworsk culture) and north (Goths). The Amber Road trade route passed along the upper Noteć and Lower Vistula valleys.

=== Middle Ages ===
Slavs began arriving in the Lower Vistula area around the 5th-6th centuries AD; the right bank was inhabited by Prussians. Christianity reached the region by the 10th century, evidenced by early Romanesque basilica foundations near Kałdus.

During Poland's fragmentation period, Gdańsk Pomerania was ruled by the local Święca family. The Chełmno Lakeland belonged to Mazovia and suffered Prussian raids, prompting Duke Konrad I of Masovia to invite the Teutonic Knights, who conquered local Vistula tribes.

In 1308, the Teutonic Order illegally seized left-bank Gdańsk Pomerania including Gdańsk, Tczew, and Świecie. The 1343 Treaty of Kalisz recognized this as a perpetual donation. The Order's Grand Master moved the headquarters from Venice to Malbork in 1309, expanding the Malbork Castle complex along the lower Vistula.

The 14th century saw the Order's state expand along the lower Vistula, founding many towns. This legacy includes numerous medieval monuments: castles in Gniew, Świecie, Nowe; Gothic churches in Chełmno, Gniew, Świecie, Nowe, and Grudziądz; and the cathedral-castle complex in Kwidzyn.

The 15th century was marked by Polish-Teutonic wars over control of the Vistula estuary, critical for exporting agricultural and forestry goods. The Thirteen Years' War restored Pomerelia, Powiśle, and Elbląg to Poland, pushing the Order eastwards with Königsberg as its new capital. Only Kwidzyn remained in Teutonic hands but as the seat of the Pomesanian bishop was not used for anti-Polish control of Vistula navigation. This balance lasted until 1772.

=== Lower Vistula Defensive System ===
Initial defense consisted of Teutonic castles in Chełmno, Kwidzyn, and Elbląg, followed by Tczew and Gniew on the left bank. By the 15th century, main strongholds at the Vistula mouths were Gdańsk and Elbląg castles controlling navigation and trade. Until the Swedish Deluge, a chain of castles (Gniew–Kwidzyn–Nowe–Grudziądz–Świecie) communicated optically via observation towers. A secondary line of castles ran parallel along land routes: Dzierzgoń, Rogoźno, Radzyń on the right bank, and Sobowidz, Starogard, Osiek, and Nowy Jasiniec on the left.

=== Economic use ===
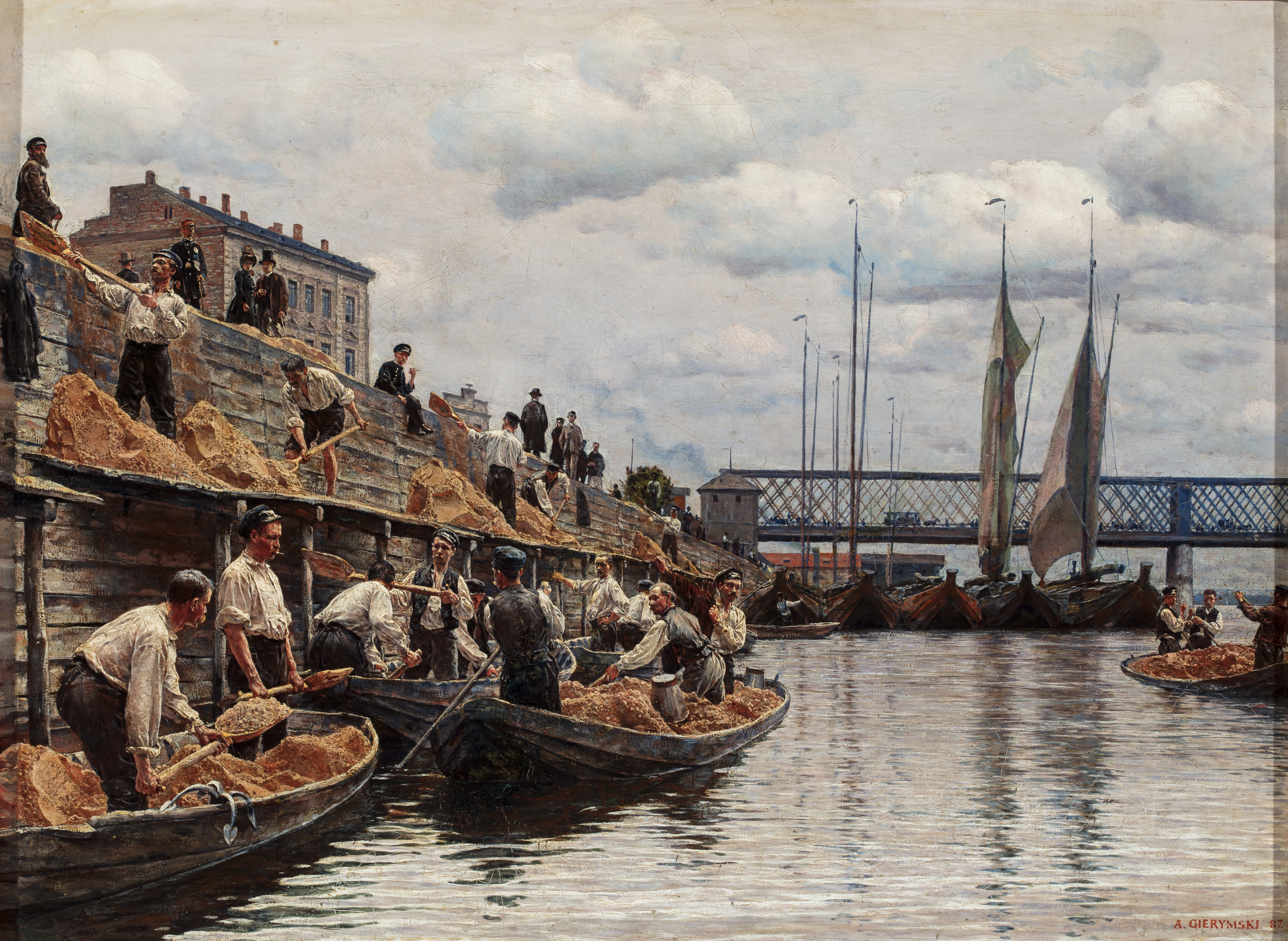
Sand miners on the Vistula, 1887

Fishing was the oldest economic activity, present since the Stone Age. Cattle breeding was also important. The most significant role of the Lower Vistula was as a waterway; all river towns were port centers. River trade was the economic base in the 16th-17th centuries.

The "golden age" of Vistula transport lasted about 300 years (1466–1768) under Polish control of the estuary. The peak was 1618 with the Gdańsk port recording the highest goods volume, mainly grain (250,000 tons), timber, potash, and shipbuilding materials. The Lower Vistula estuary was Western Europe's primary supplier. At the time, the Vistula was the world's economically most important river. The Rhine matched similar freight volumes only in 1830, two centuries later.

Between 1740 and 1796, around 1,000 Vistula ships entered Gdańsk annually; about half were 'szkut' and 20% 'komięg' vessels. Dutch traders dominated maritime trade with Gdańsk in the mid-17th century, influencing the region's economy, culture, and architecture. Cargo originated from the entire basin, including Lesser Poland, Podolia, Volhynia, Ukraine, and grain-producing Kujawy and Greater Poland.

Floating trade was the wealth base for riverside towns, with merchant classes active in Bydgoszcz, Świecie, Gniew, and Grudziądz. Grain merchants were notable in Bydgoszcz, Gniew, and Grudziądz; timber merchants in Świecie. Grudziądz was an export port for Chełmno land, while Bydgoszcz was a major trade center storing grain from Krajna and Greater Poland.

Remnants of granary complexes still attest to the importance of riverside trade, e.g., in Grudziądz and Bydgoszcz.

=== Olęder settlements ===
In the 16th century, Dutch settlers (Olędrzy) arrived in the Vistula Delta, fleeing religious persecution as Mennonites. Skilled in dyke building and land drainage, they were welcomed in floodplains. Initial Olęder settlements appeared in the late 16th century in the Sartowice-Nowe lowlands, spreading across the Lower Vistula Valley. Their economy focused on cattle breeding, introducing Dutch breeds and fattening oxen for the Gdańsk market. They built dykes, canals, and drainage ditches still visible today.

=== Swedish Wars ===
The Swedish Deluge in the 17th and 18th centuries caused economic decline, as Sweden sought control over Baltic ports Gdańsk and Elbląg to dominate Vistula trade revenues. The Lower Vistula was a primary battleground in the 1626–1629 war and later devastation during the Deluge (1655–1660), causing depopulation.

=== Partitions of Poland ===
The political order established after the Thirteen Years' War lasted over 300 years, despite changes. Prussia evolved from a Polish fief to an independent kingdom threatening Poland. In 1765, Frederick II established customs in Kwidzyn and imposed 10% duties on Vistula trade.

In the First Partition of Poland (1772), the Lower Vistula lands were annexed by Prussia (except Gdańsk, annexed in the Second Partition). High duties collected in Fordon and Nowy Port drastically reduced Polish Vistula exports. The Lower Vistula segment became a secondary waterway, and ports like Gdańsk and Elbląg declined.

== Gallery ==
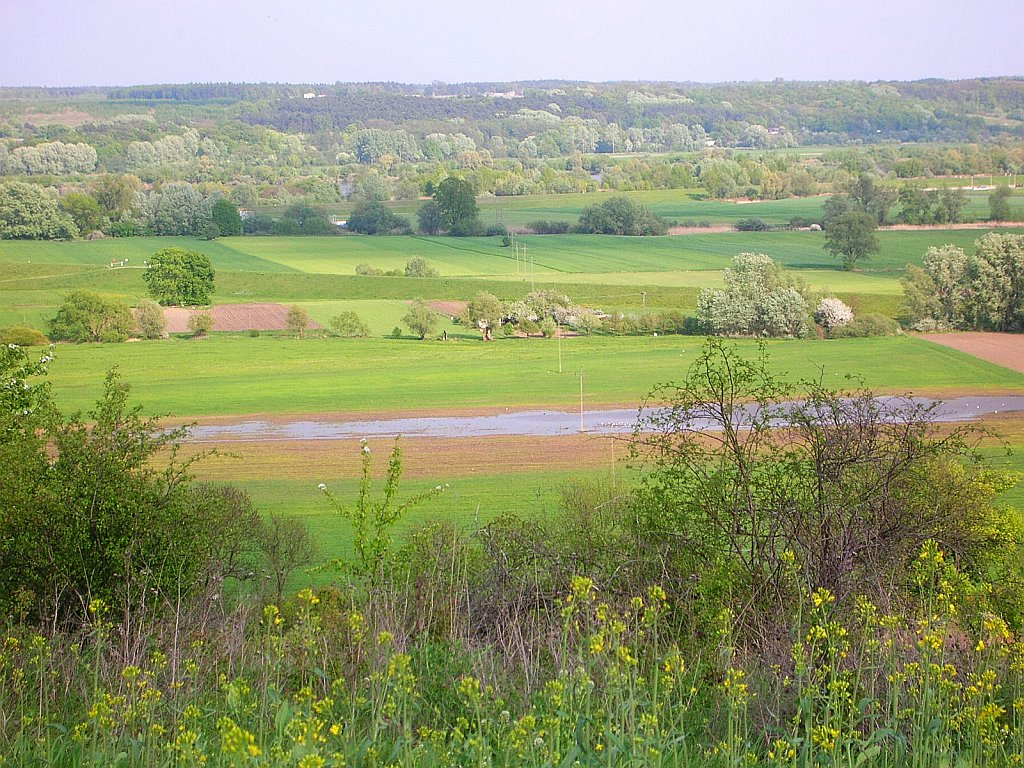
The breakthrough Fordon Gorge of the Vistula Valley below Fordon

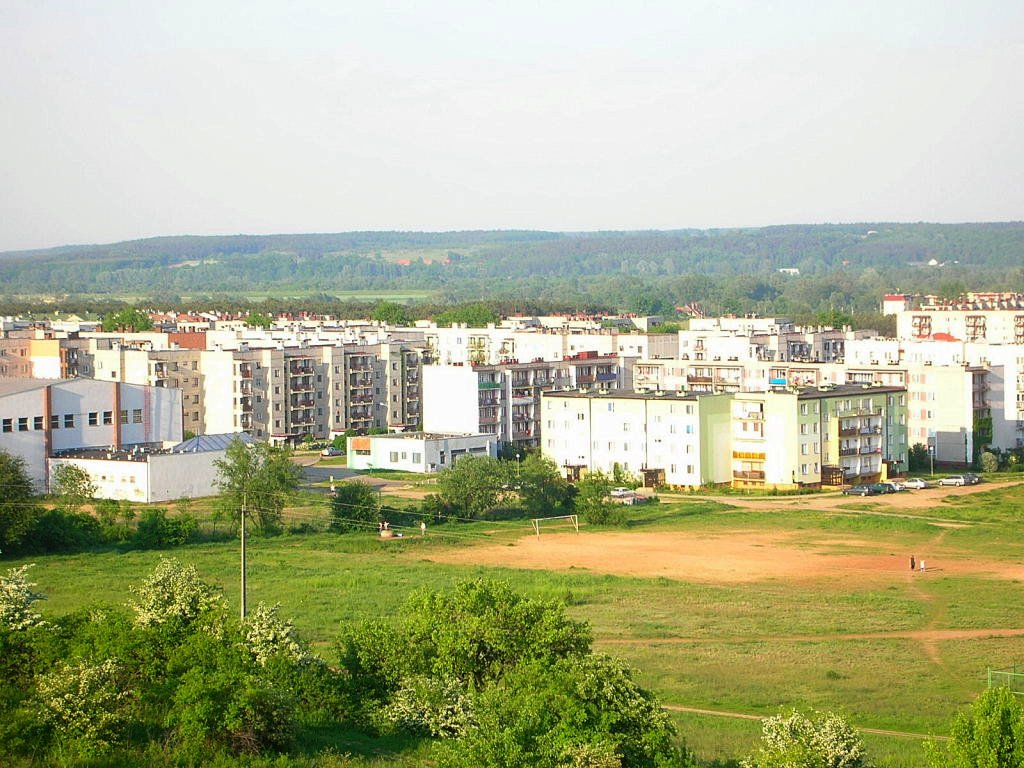
Buildings of the Tatrzańskie estate in Bydgoszcz against the slope of the Fordon Valley

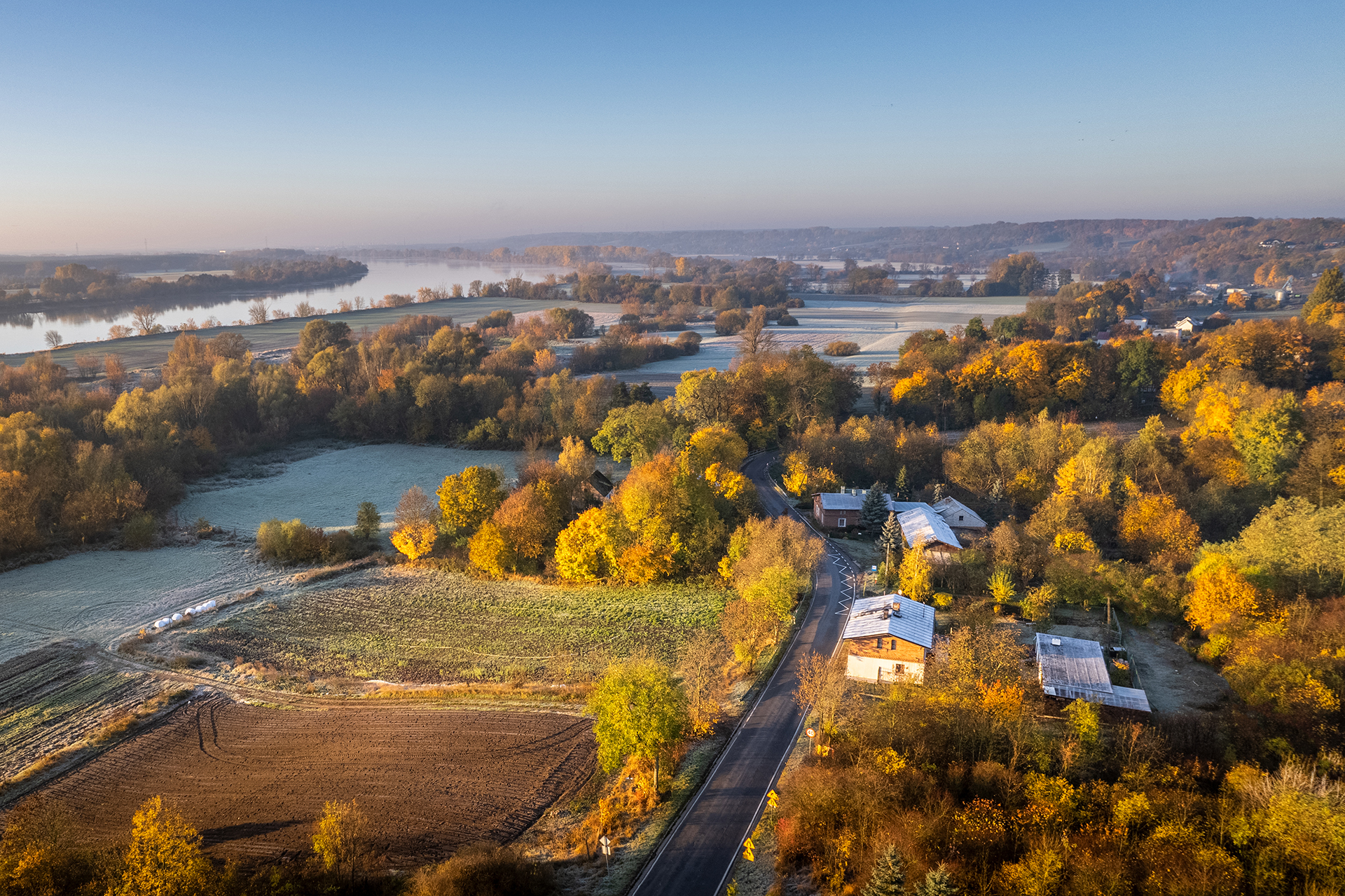
The Vistula at Trzęsacz

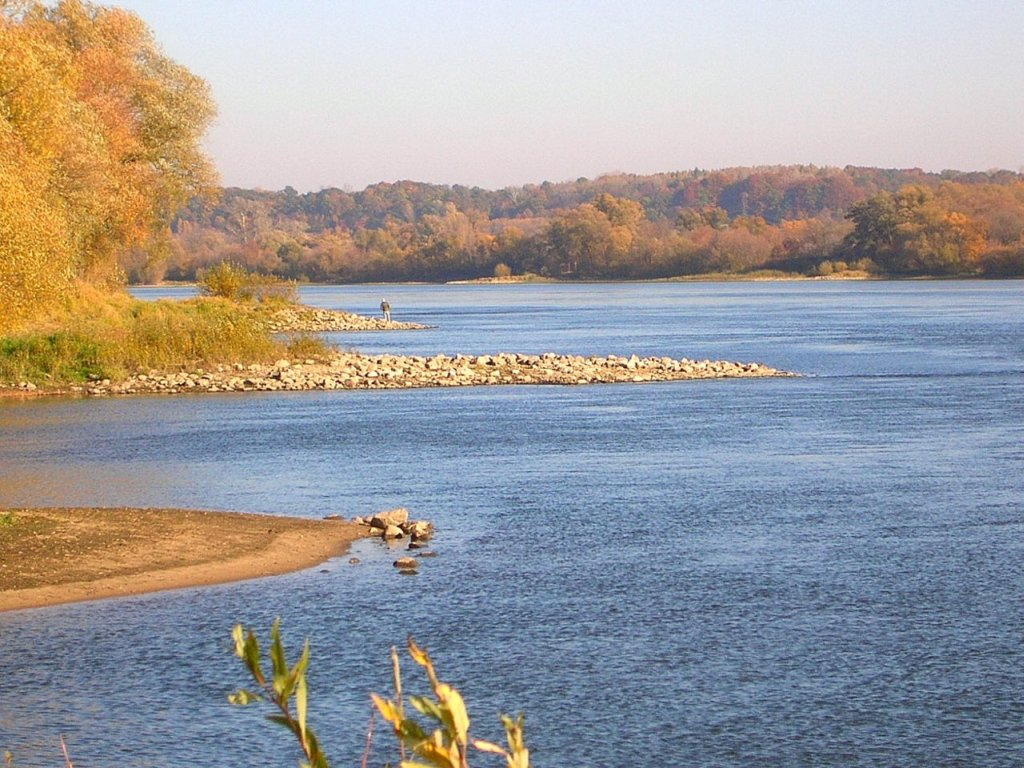
Regulation groynes on the Vistula

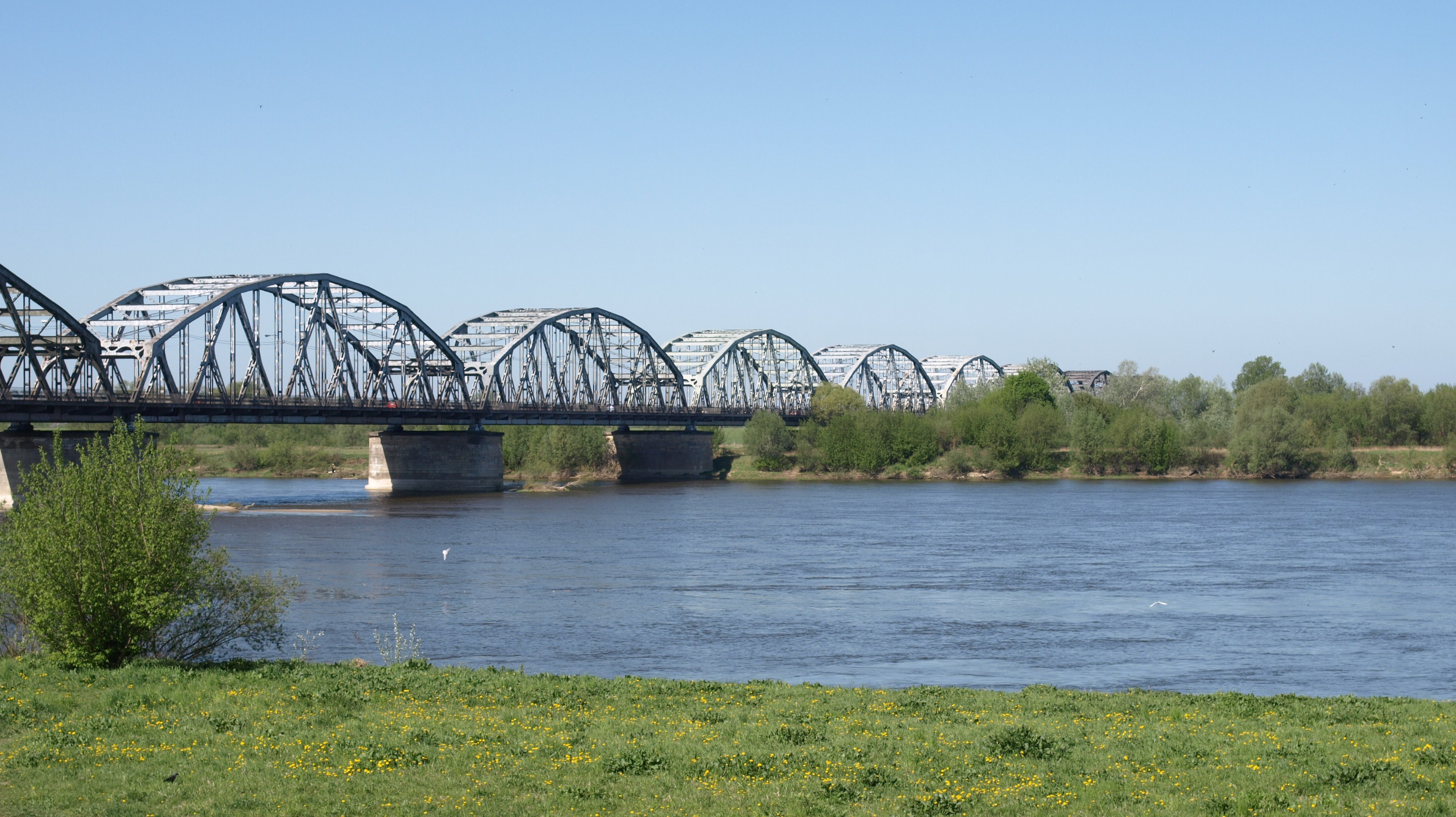
Bridge over the Vistula in Grudziądz

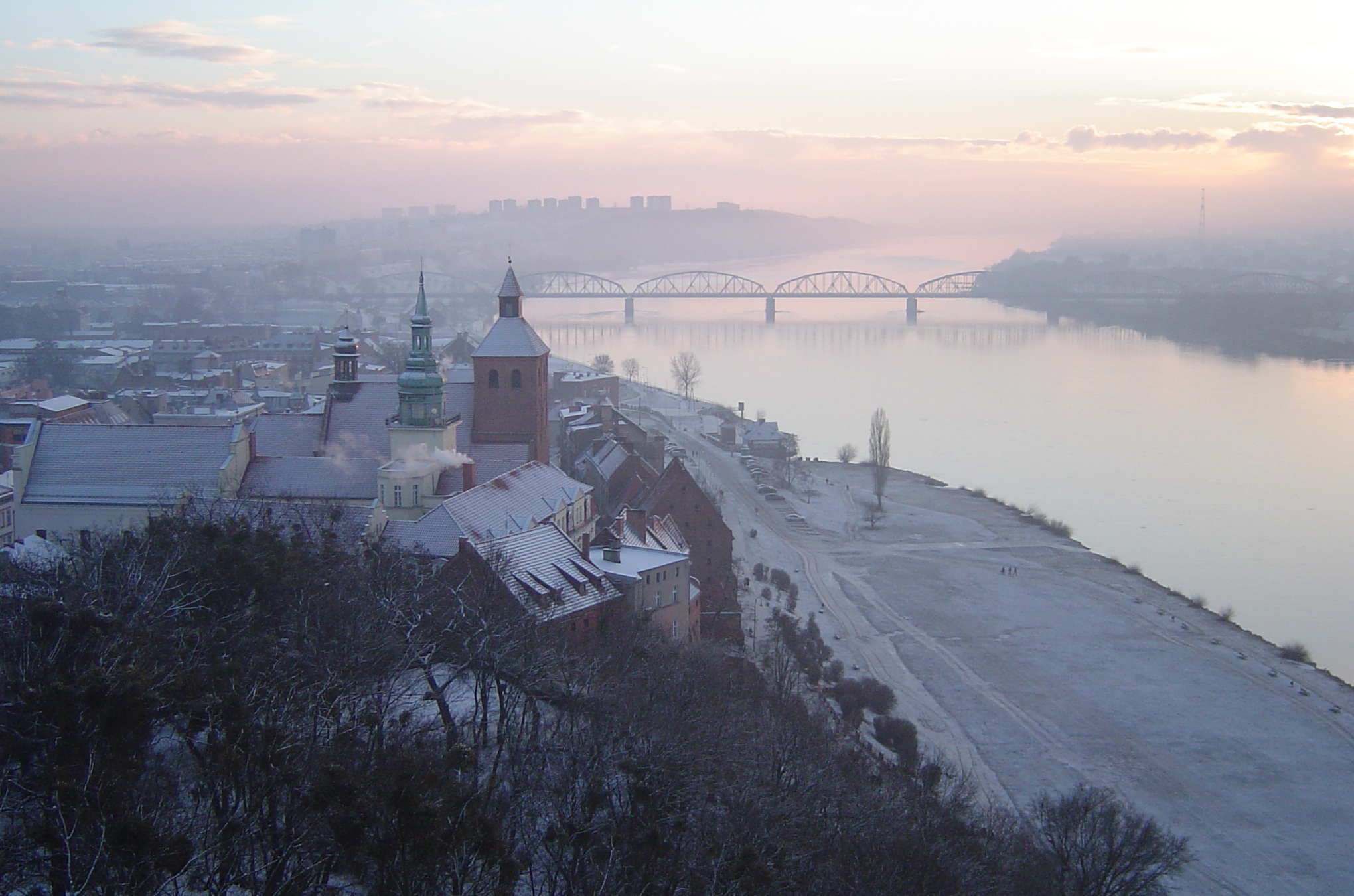
Castle Hill in Grudziądz

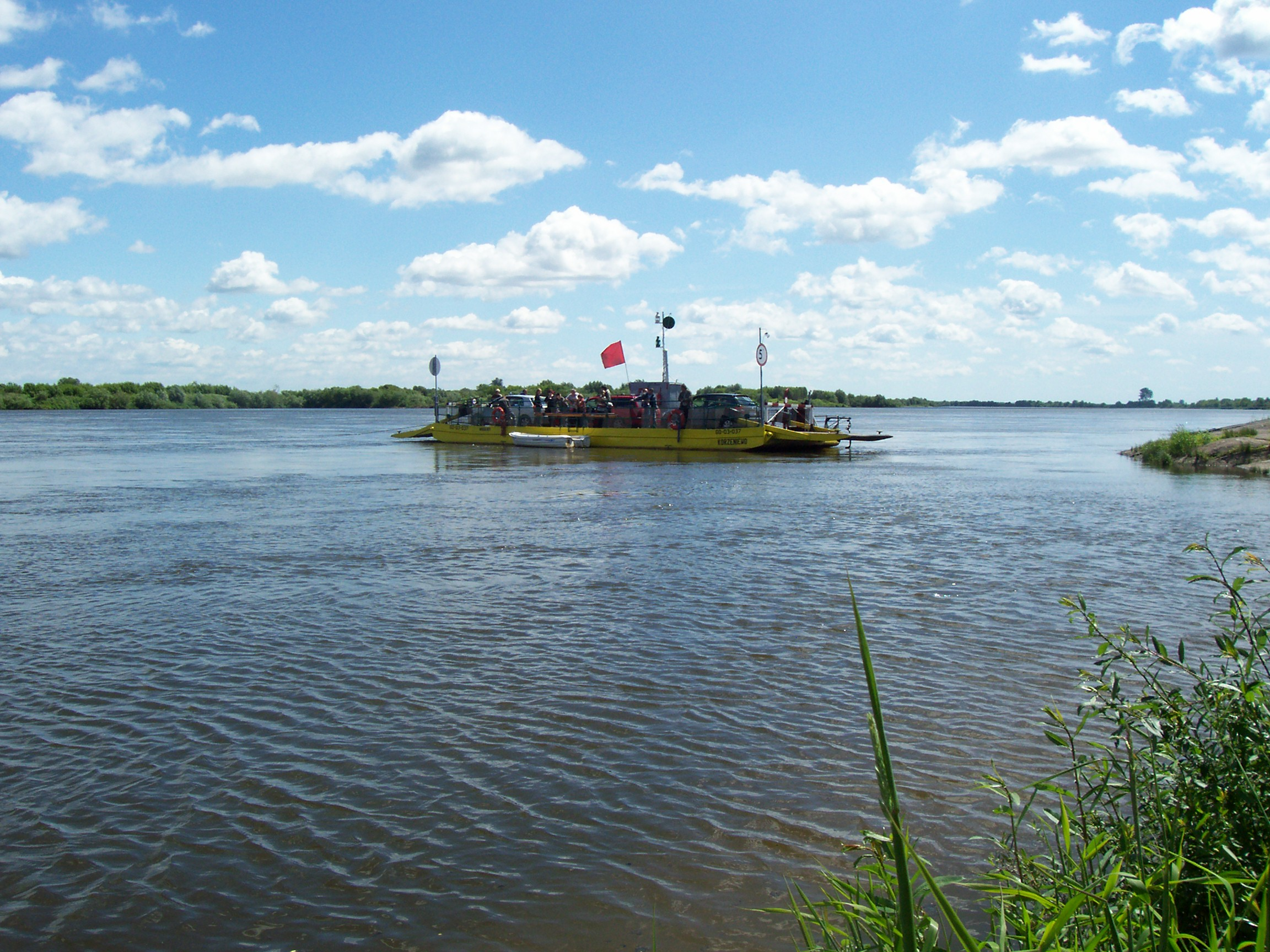
Ferry in Gniew

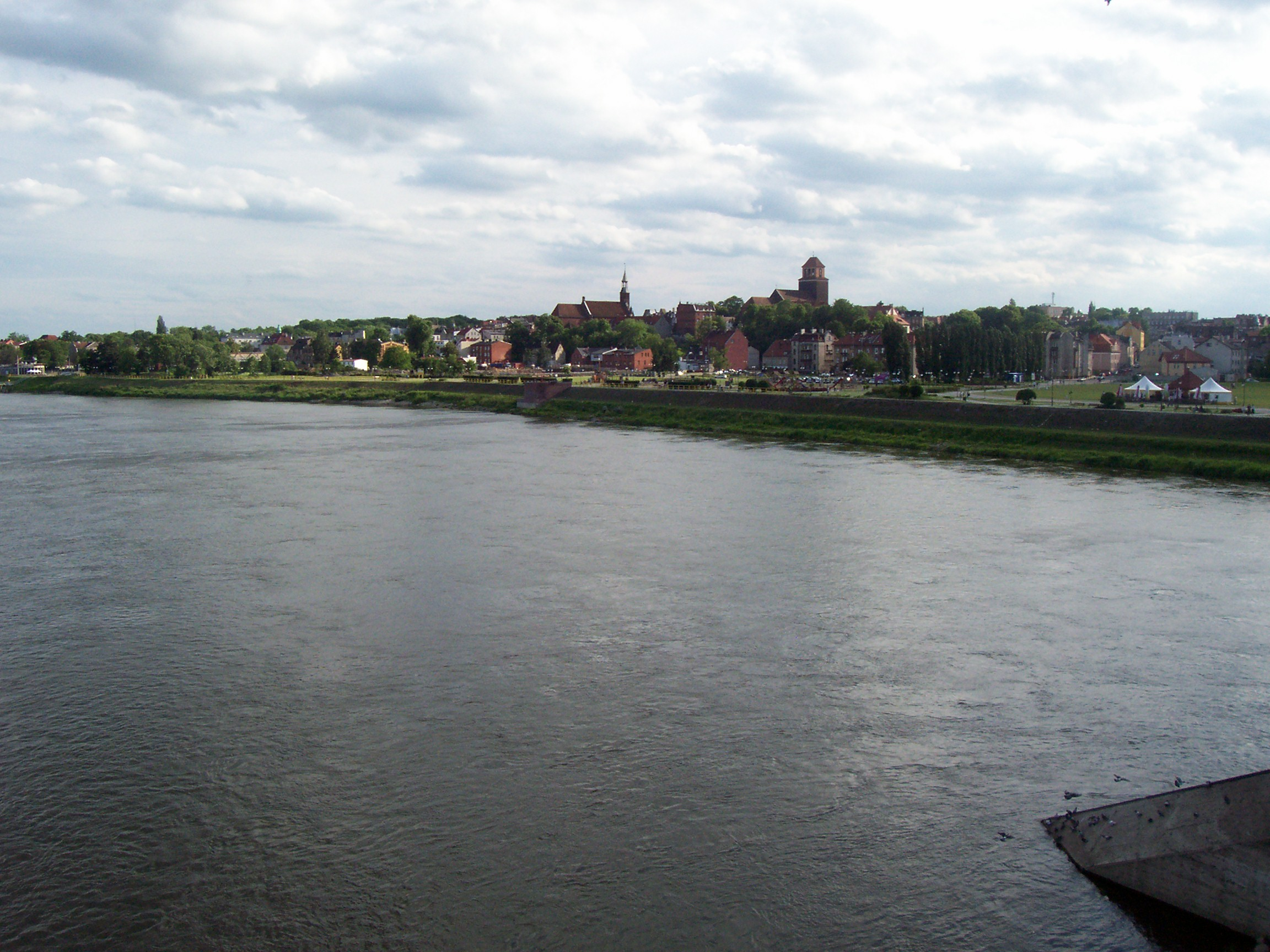
The Vistula near Tczew
