= Dębowiec, Bydgoszcz County =

Dębowiec
- Village
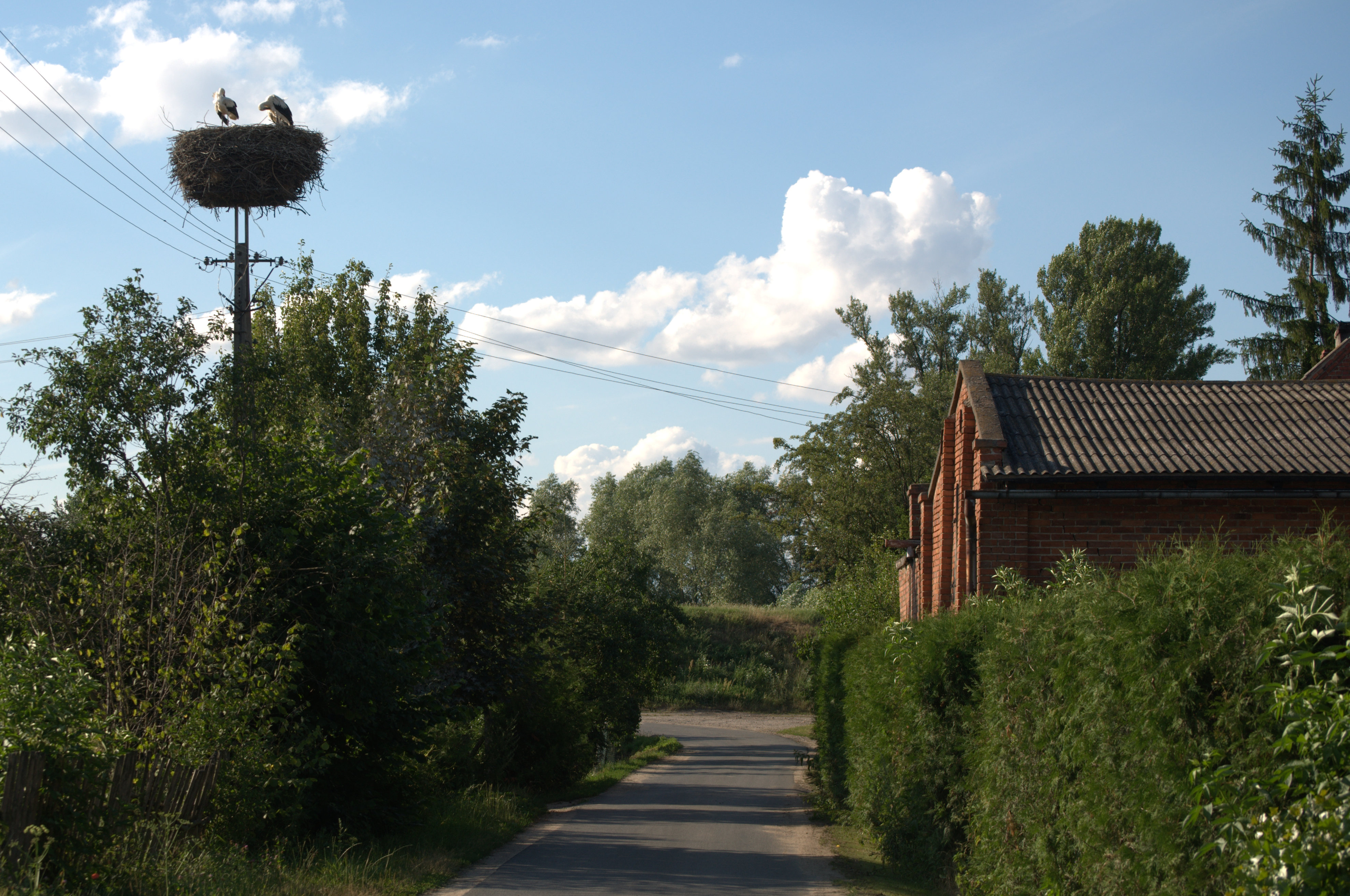

- Location within Poland
- Coordinates: 53°13′56″N 18°17′50″E
- Country: Poland
- Voivodeship: Kuyavian-Pomeranian
- County: Bydgoszcz
- Gmina: Dąbrowa Chełmińska
- Time zone: UTC+1 (CET)
  - Summer (DST): UTC+2 (CEST)
- Vehicle registration: CBY

Dębowiec [dɛmˈbɔvjɛt͡s] is a village in the administrative district of Gmina Dąbrowa Chełmińska, within Bydgoszcz County, Kuyavian-Pomeranian Voivodeship, in north-central Poland.

Dębowiec was a private village, administratively located in the Chełmno Voivodeship of the Kingdom of Poland.
