= Reptowo, Kuyavian-Pomeranian Voivodeship =

Reptowo
- Village
- Location within Poland
- Coordinates: 53°10′13″N 18°13′48″E
- Country: Poland
- Voivodeship: Kuyavian-Pomeranian
- County: Bydgoszcz
- Gmina: Dąbrowa Chełmińska
- Population: 100

Reptowo [rɛpˈtɔvɔ] is a village in the administrative district of Gmina Dąbrowa Chełmińska, within Bydgoszcz County, Kuyavian-Pomeranian Voivodeship, in north-central Poland.
