= Czemlewo =

- Village
- Location within Poland
- Coordinates: 53°12′N 18°17′E
- Country: Poland
- Voivodeship: Kuyavian-Pomeranian
- County: Bydgoszcz
- Gmina: Dąbrowa Chełmińska
- Population: 10

Czemlewo [t͡ʂɛmˈlɛvɔ] is a village in the administrative district of Gmina Dąbrowa Chełmińska, within Bydgoszcz County, Kuyavian-Pomeranian Voivodeship, in north-central Poland.
