= Mała Kępa =

- Village
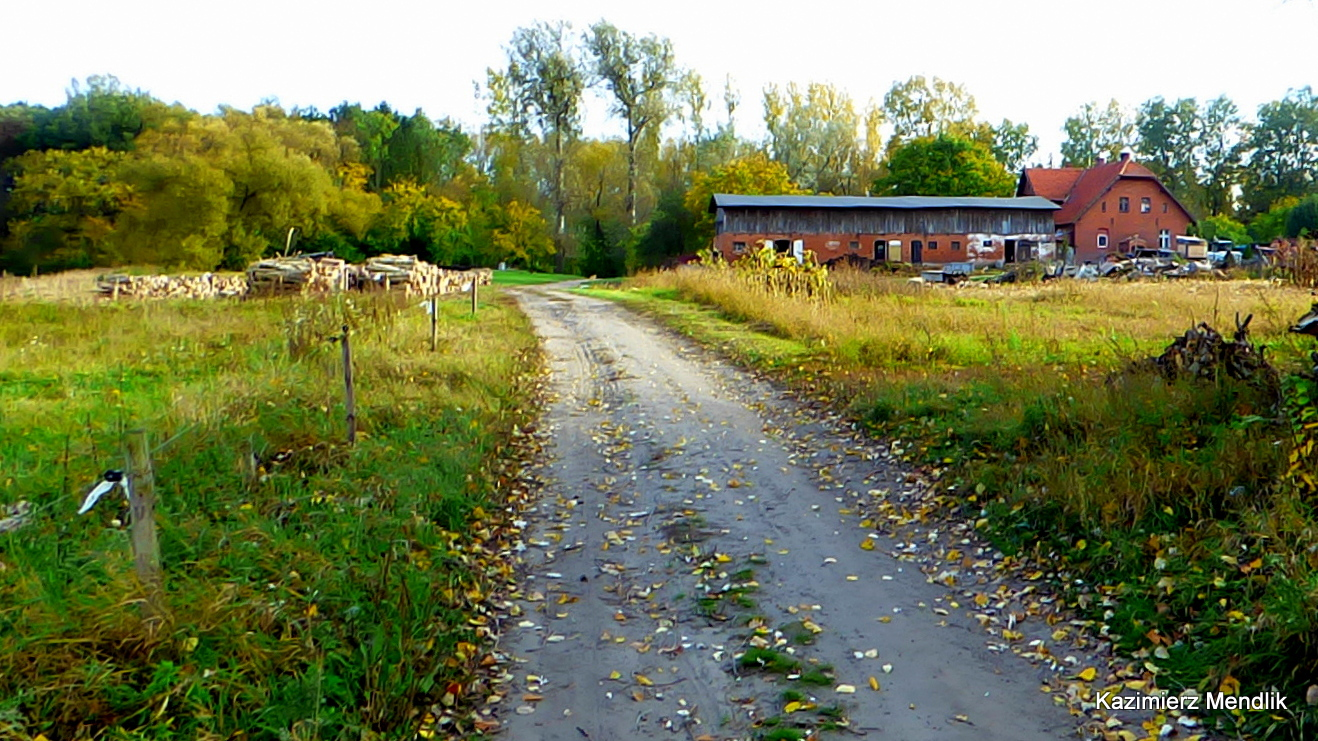

- Location within Poland
- Coordinates: 53°07′43″N 18°09′25″E
- Country: Poland
- Voivodeship: Kuyavian-Pomeranian
- County: Bydgoszcz
- Gmina: Dąbrowa Chełmińska

Mała Kępa [ˈmawa ˈkɛmpa] is a village in the administrative district of Gmina Dąbrowa Chełmińska, within Bydgoszcz County, Kuyavian-Pomeranian Voivodeship, in north-central Poland.
