= Słończ =

- Village
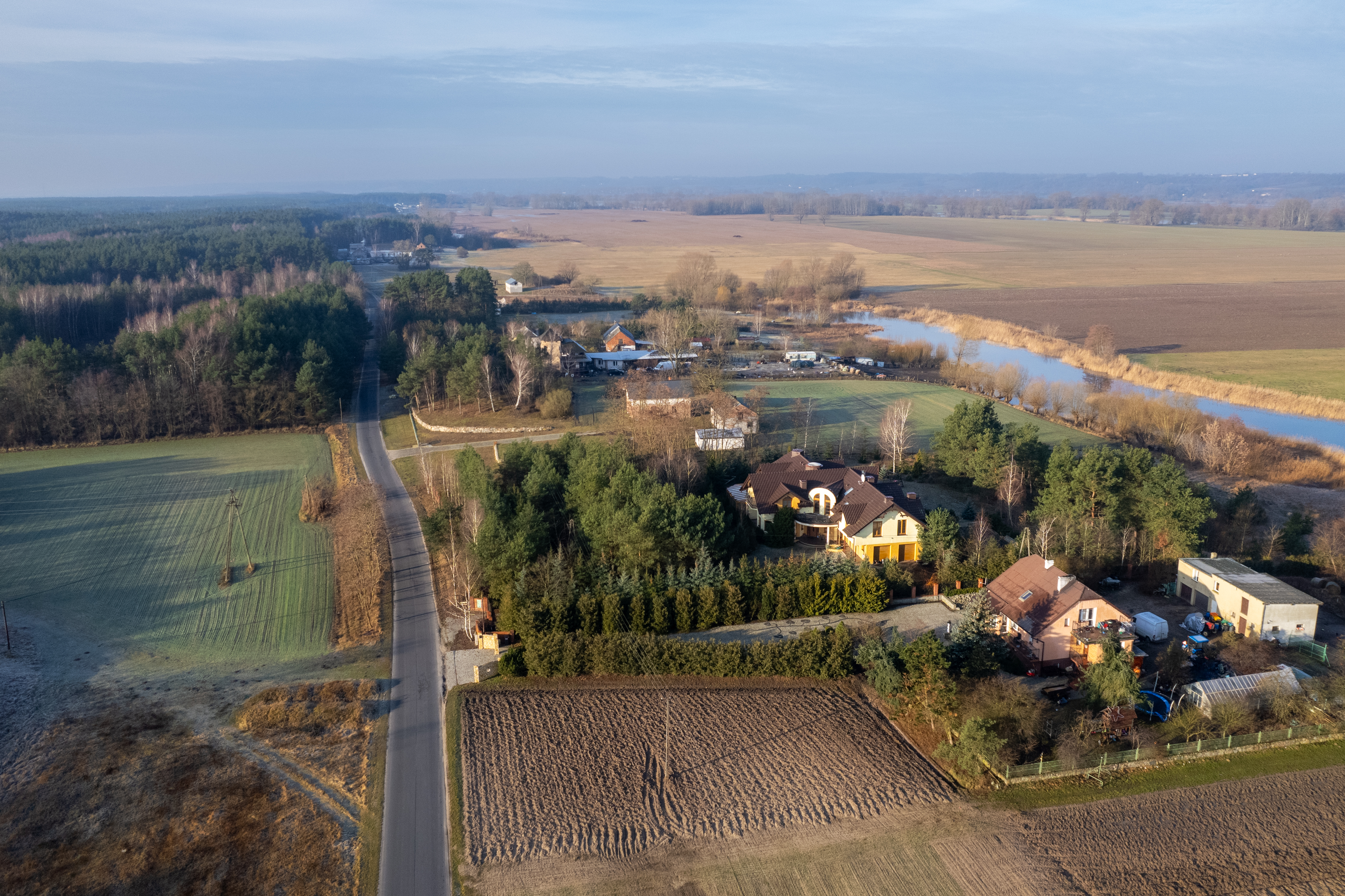
- Aerial view of Słończ (2024)

- Location within Poland
- Coordinates: 53°14′N 18°15′E
- Country: Poland
- Voivodeship: Kuyavian-Pomeranian
- County: Bydgoszcz
- Gmina: Dąbrowa Chełmińska
- Time zone: UTC+1 (CET)
  - Summer (DST): UTC+2 (CEST)
- Vehicle registration: CBY

Słończ [swɔɲt͡ʂ] is a village in the administrative district of Gmina Dąbrowa Chełmińska, within Bydgoszcz County, Kuyavian-Pomeranian Voivodeship, in north-central Poland.

Słończ was a private village, administratively located in the Chełmno Voivodeship of the Kingdom of Poland.
