= Bolumin =

- Village
- Location within Poland
- Coordinates: 53°8′50″N 18°17′38″E
- Country: Poland
- Voivodeship: Kuyavian-Pomeranian
- County: Bydgoszcz
- Gmina: Dąbrowa Chełmińska

Bolumin [bɔˈlumin] is a village in the administrative district of Gmina Dąbrowa Chełmińska, within Bydgoszcz County, Kuyavian-Pomeranian Voivodeship, in north-central Poland.
