= Gmina Dąbrowa Chełmińska =

Gmina Dąbrowa Chełmińska Dąbrowa Chełmińska Commune
- Gmina
- Coat of arms

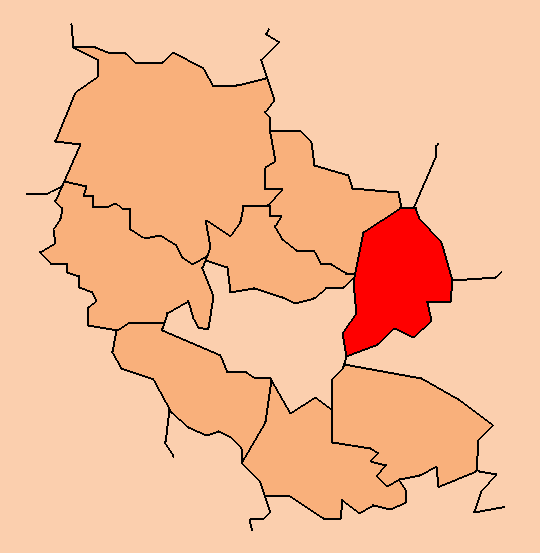
- Location within the county
- Coordinates (Dąbrowa Chełmińska): 53°11′N 18°18′E
- Country: Poland
- Voivodeship: Kuyavian-Pomeranian
- County: Bydgoszcz County
- Seat: Dąbrowa Chełmińska

Area
  - Total: 124.62 km^{2} (48.12 sq mi)

Population (2006)
  - Total: 7,179
  - Density: 57.61/km^{2} (149.2/sq mi)
- Website: http://www.dabrowachelminska.lo.pl/

Gmina Dąbrowa Chełmińska is a rural gmina (administrative district) in Bydgoszcz County, Kuyavian-Pomeranian Voivodeship, in north-central Poland. Its seat is the village of Dąbrowa Chełmińska, which lies approximately 22 kilometres (14 mi) east of Bydgoszcz and 27 km (17 mi) north-west of Toruń.

The gmina covers an area of 124.62 square kilometres (48.1 sq mi), and as of 2006 its total population is 7,179.

== Villages ==
Gmina Dąbrowa Chełmińska contains the villages and settlements of Bolumin, Boluminek, Borki, Czarże, Czemlewo, Dąbrowa Chełmińska, Dębowiec, Gzin, Gzin Dolny, Janowo, Mała Kępa, Mozgowina, Nowy Dwór, Ostromecko, Otowice, Pień, Rafa, Reptowo, Słończ, Strzyżawa, Wałdowo Królewskie and Wielka Kępa.

== Neighbouring gminas ==
Gmina Dąbrowa Chełmińska is bordered by the city of Bydgoszcz and by the gminas of Dobrcz, Unisław and Zławieś Wielka.
