= Rafa, Kuyavian-Pomeranian Voivodeship =

Rafa
- Village
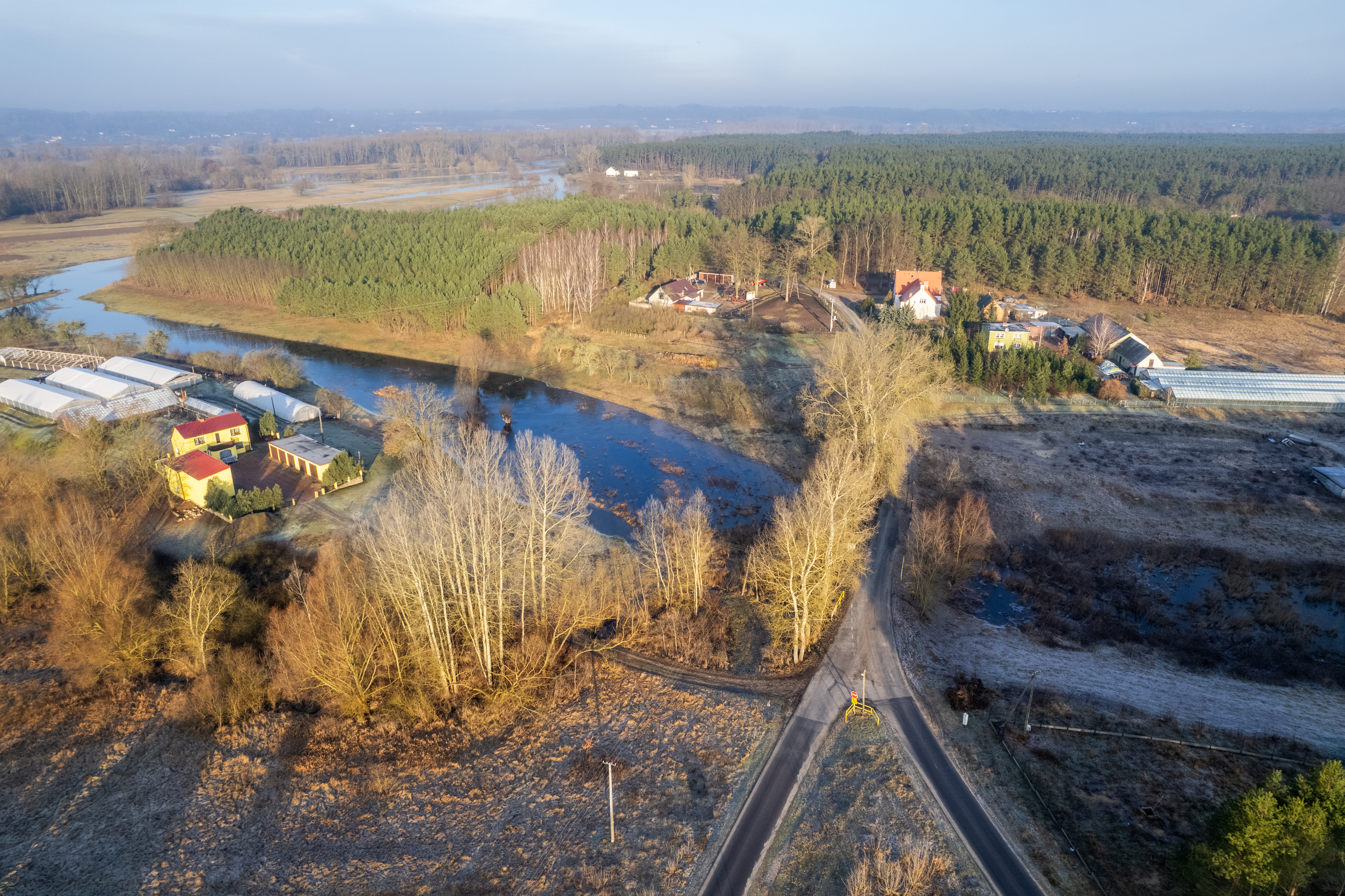

- Location within Poland
- Coordinates: 53°12′N 18°13′E
- Country: Poland
- Voivodeship: Kuyavian-Pomeranian
- County: Bydgoszcz
- Gmina: Dąbrowa Chełmińska
- Time zone: UTC+1 (CET)
  - Summer (DST): UTC+2 (CEST)
- Vehicle registration: CBY

Rafa [ˈrafa] is a village in the administrative district of Gmina Dąbrowa Chełmińska, within Bydgoszcz County, Kuyavian-Pomeranian Voivodeship, in north-central Poland.

Six Polish citizens were murdered by Nazi Germany in the village during World War II.
