= Ostromecko =

- Village
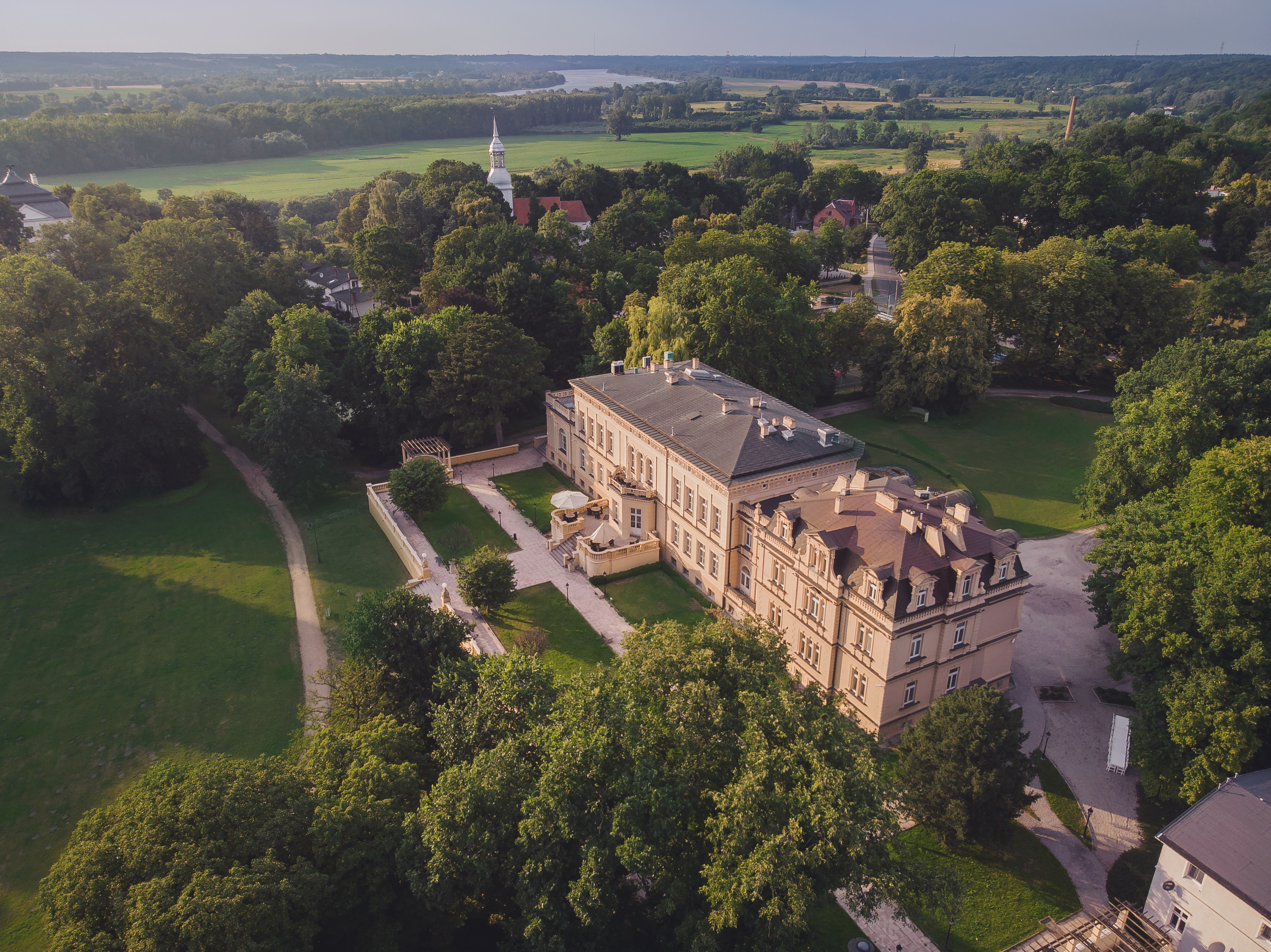
- Palaces and park ensemble in Ostromecko

- Location within Poland
- Coordinates: 53°9′N 18°13′E
- Country: Poland
- Voivodeship: Kuyavian-Pomeranian
- County: Bydgoszcz
- Gmina: Dąbrowa Chełmińska
- First mentioned: 1222
- Town rights: 25 August 1750
- Town rights revoked: 5 August 1772

Population
  - Total: 880
- Time zone: UTC+1 (CET)
  - Summer (DST): UTC+2 (CEST)
- Vehicle registration: CBY
- Primary airport: Bydgoszcz Ignacy Jan Paderewski Airport

Ostromecko [ɔstrɔˈmɛt͡skɔ] is a village in the administrative district of Gmina Dąbrowa Chełmińska, within Bydgoszcz County, Kuyavian-Pomeranian Voivodeship, in north-central Poland.

== History ==
The village was first mentioned in a document of 1222. Ostromecko was a fortified stronghold protecting a trade route connecting Bydgoszcz with Chełmno and the Baltic coast. Ostromecko was granted town rights in 1750. It was located in the Chełmno Voivodeship of the Kingdom of Poland. In 1772, it was annexed by Prussia in the First Partition of Poland and deprived of town rights. In 1807, it was regained by Poles and included within the short-lived Duchy of Warsaw. After the duchy's dissolution in 1815, it was re-annexed by Prussia. Following World War I, Poland regained independence and control of Ostromecko.

During the German occupation of Poland (World War II), Ostromecko was one of the sites of executions of Poles, carried out by the Germans in 1939 as part of the Intelligenzaktion.

== Sights ==
The landmark of Ostromecko is the palaces and park ensemble, which contains the Andrzej Szwalbe Collection of Historical Pianos, one of two largest such collections in Poland. There is also the Baroque Saint Nicholas church and the Marian Forest nature reserve.

=== Nature Reserve ===
The Marian Forest Nature Reserve - a forest reserve with an area of 31.8 hectares, located in the Kuyavian-Pomeranian Voivodeship, is located in the Toruń Forest District, on the northern edge of the village of Ostromecko.

It is one of the earliest established and next nature reserves.

The beginnings of landscape protection of today's reserve date back to the 19th century. The forested slope of the Vistula Valley was called the Maria Park, from the name of Marta Matilda Maria Alvensleben-Schönborn (1854-1915) - heir to the estate of Ostromecko and the wife of Albrecht von Alvensleben (1840-1928). A road was made on its area with bridges, along which birchwood benches were set.

The reserve was created to protect diverse forest complexes overgrowing steep canyons and the Vistula valley steam: from the ash-alder forest through the subcontinental forest, fertile low beech forest to mixed continental forest. This area also has high landscape values, due to the large denivelation of the terrain, spring and groundwater exudates.

== Gallery ==
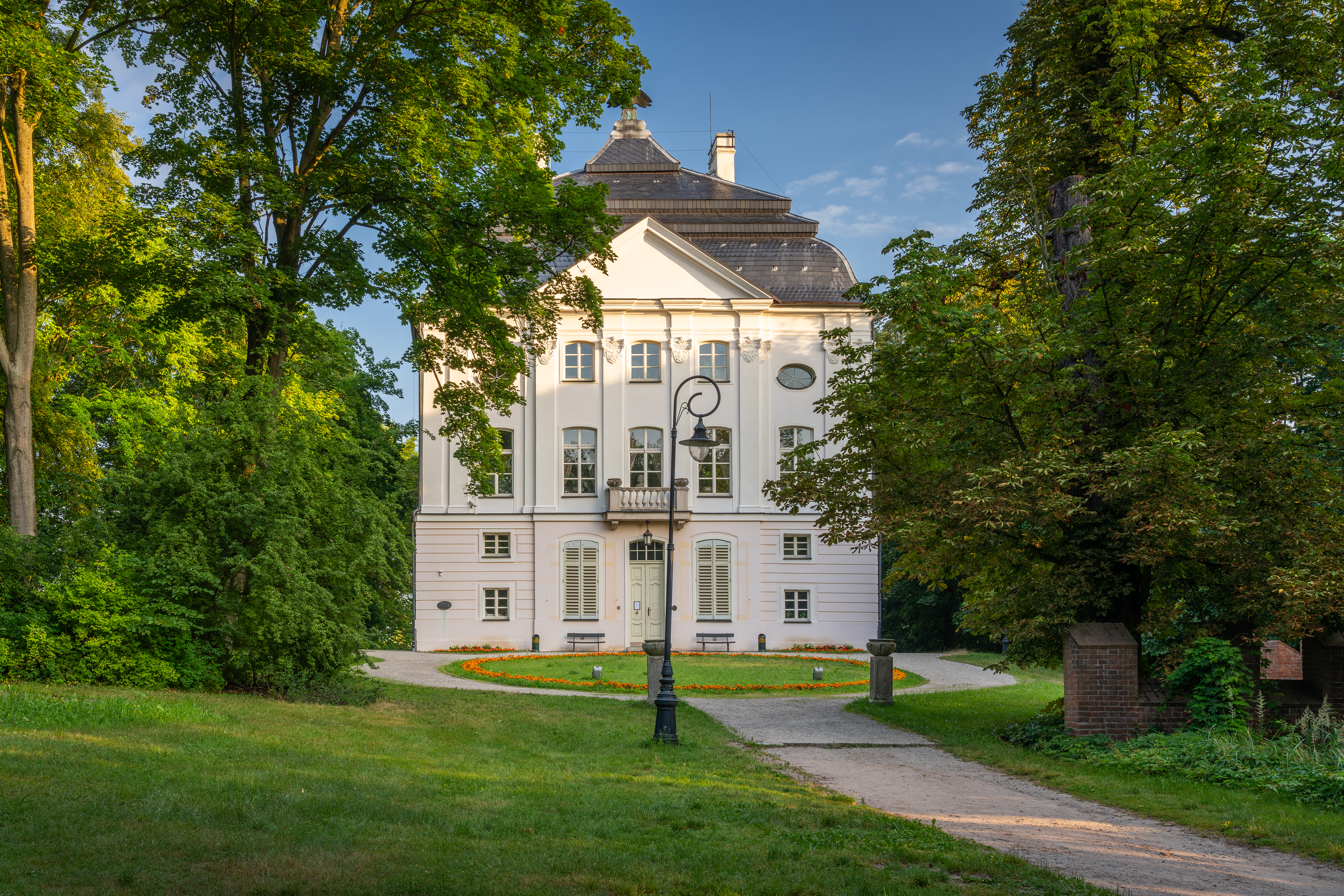
Old palace

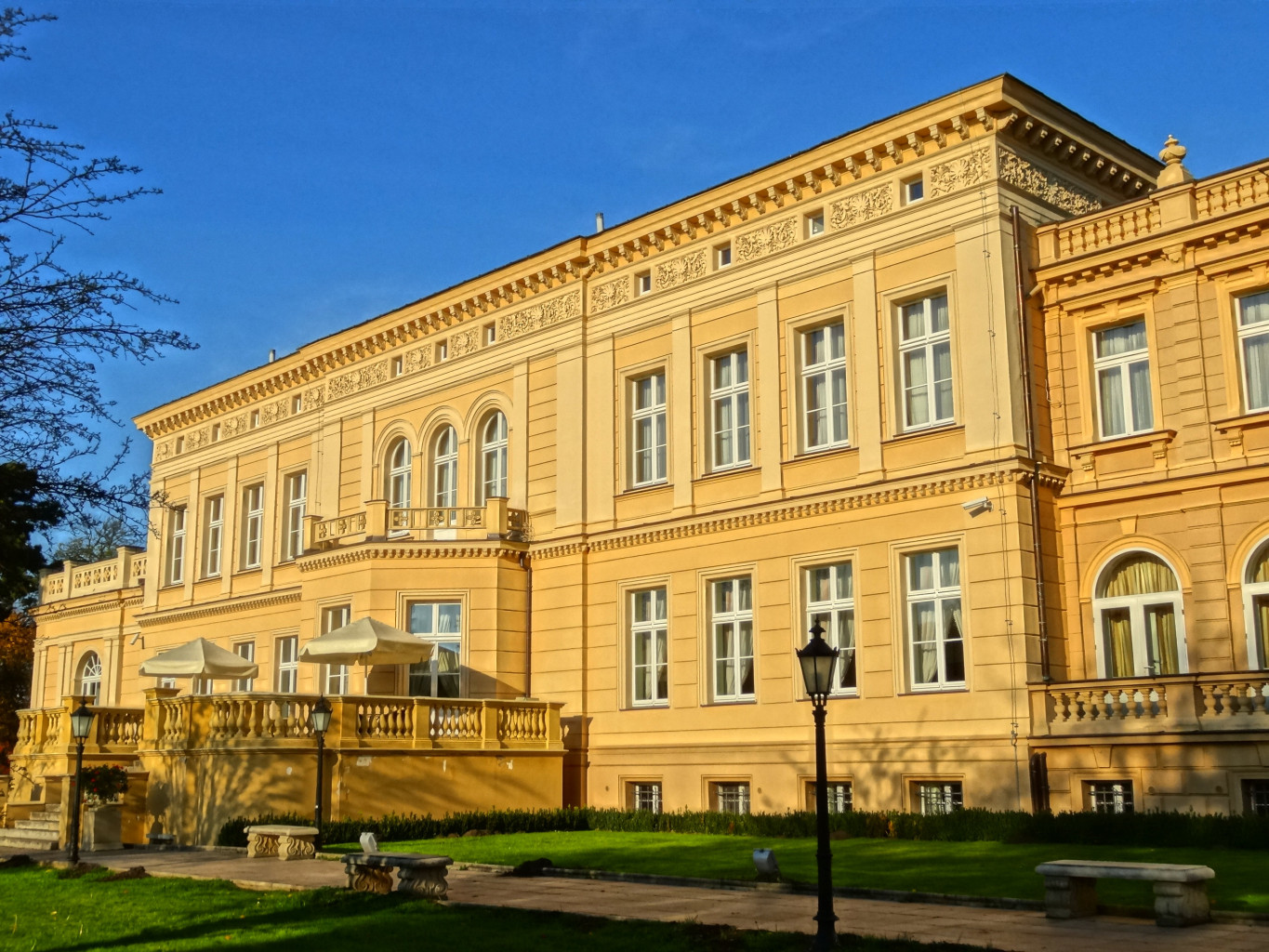
New palace

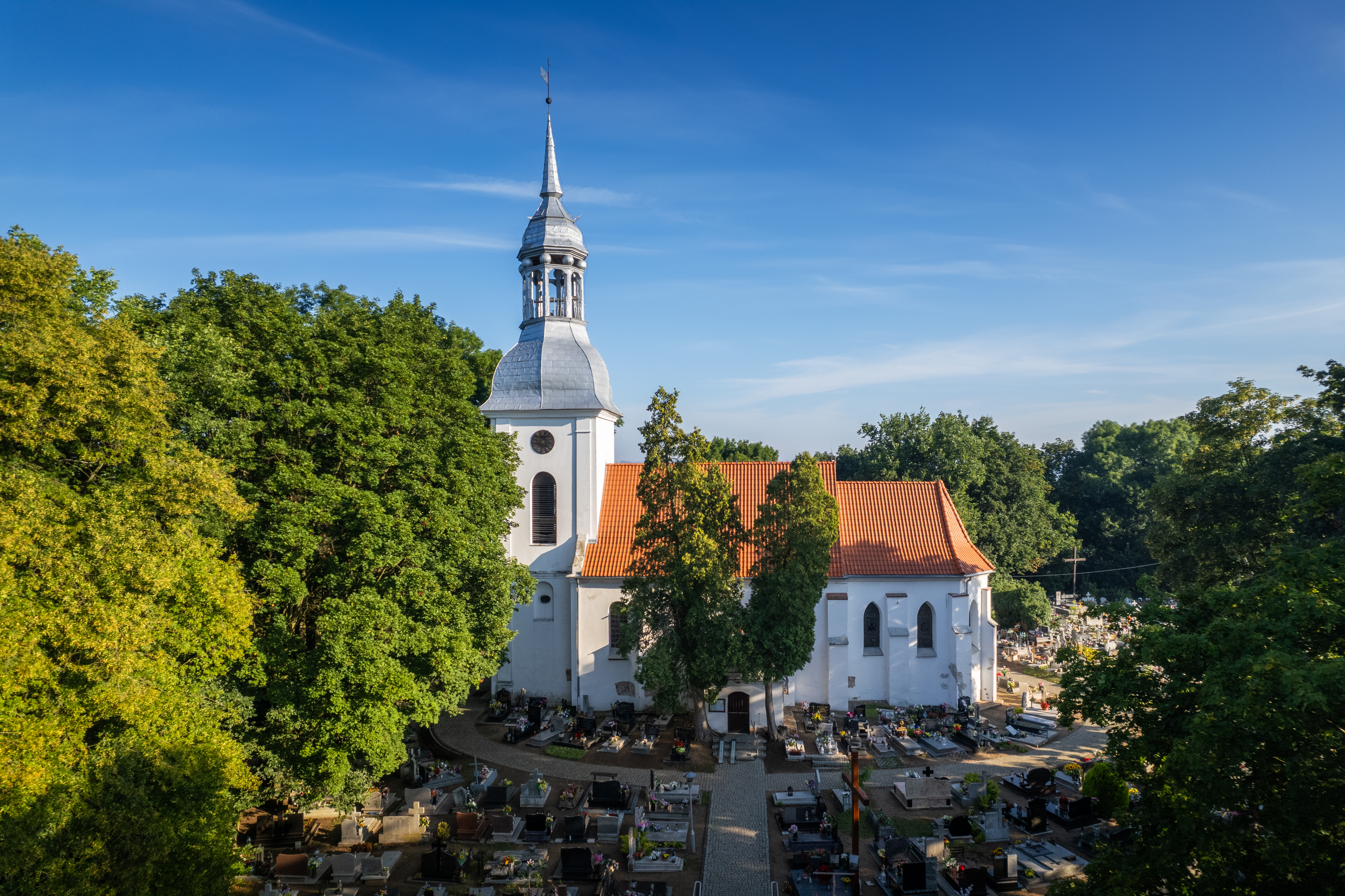
Saint Nicholas church

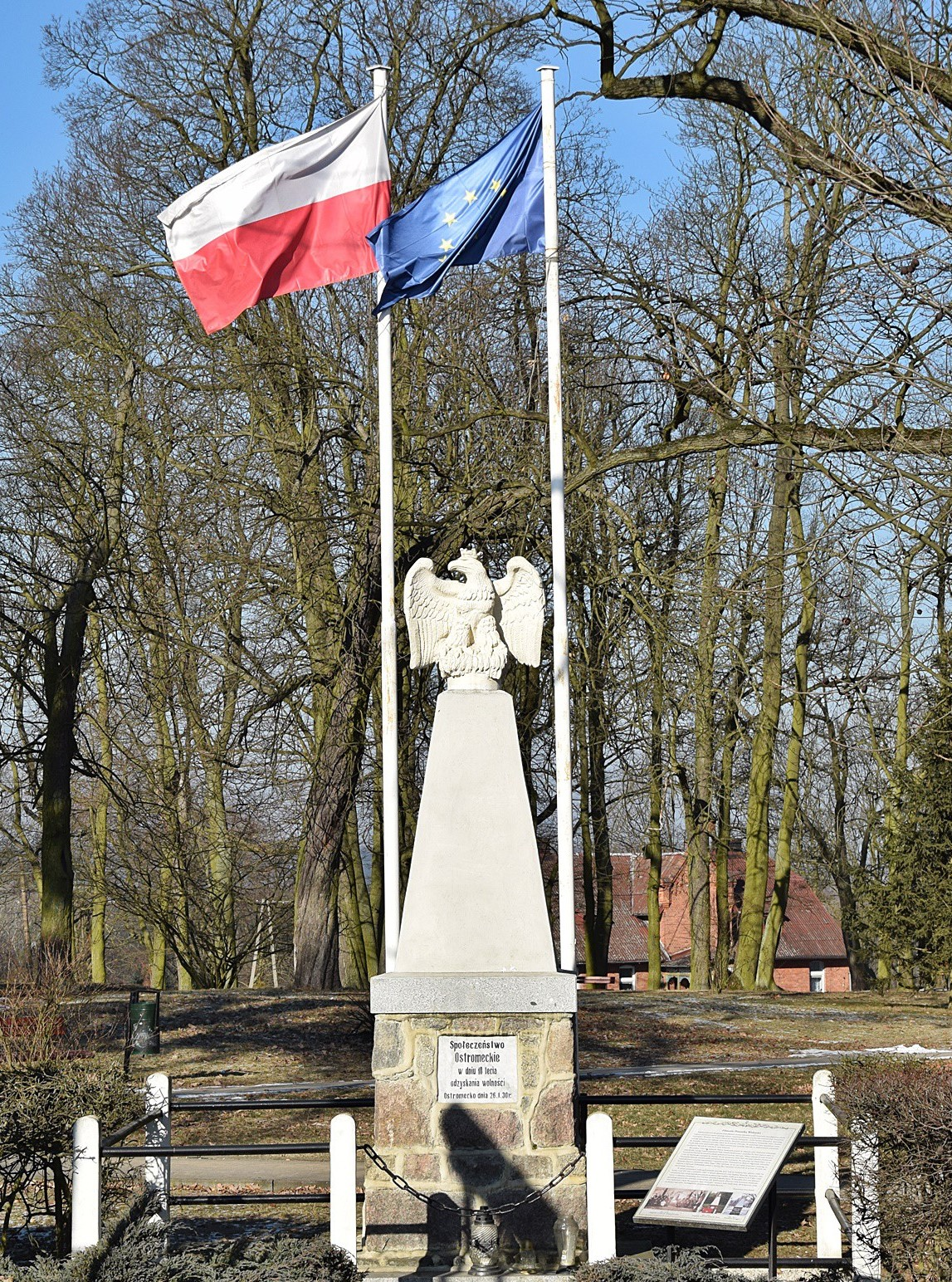
Polish Independence Monument
