= Dąbrowa Chełmińska =

- Village
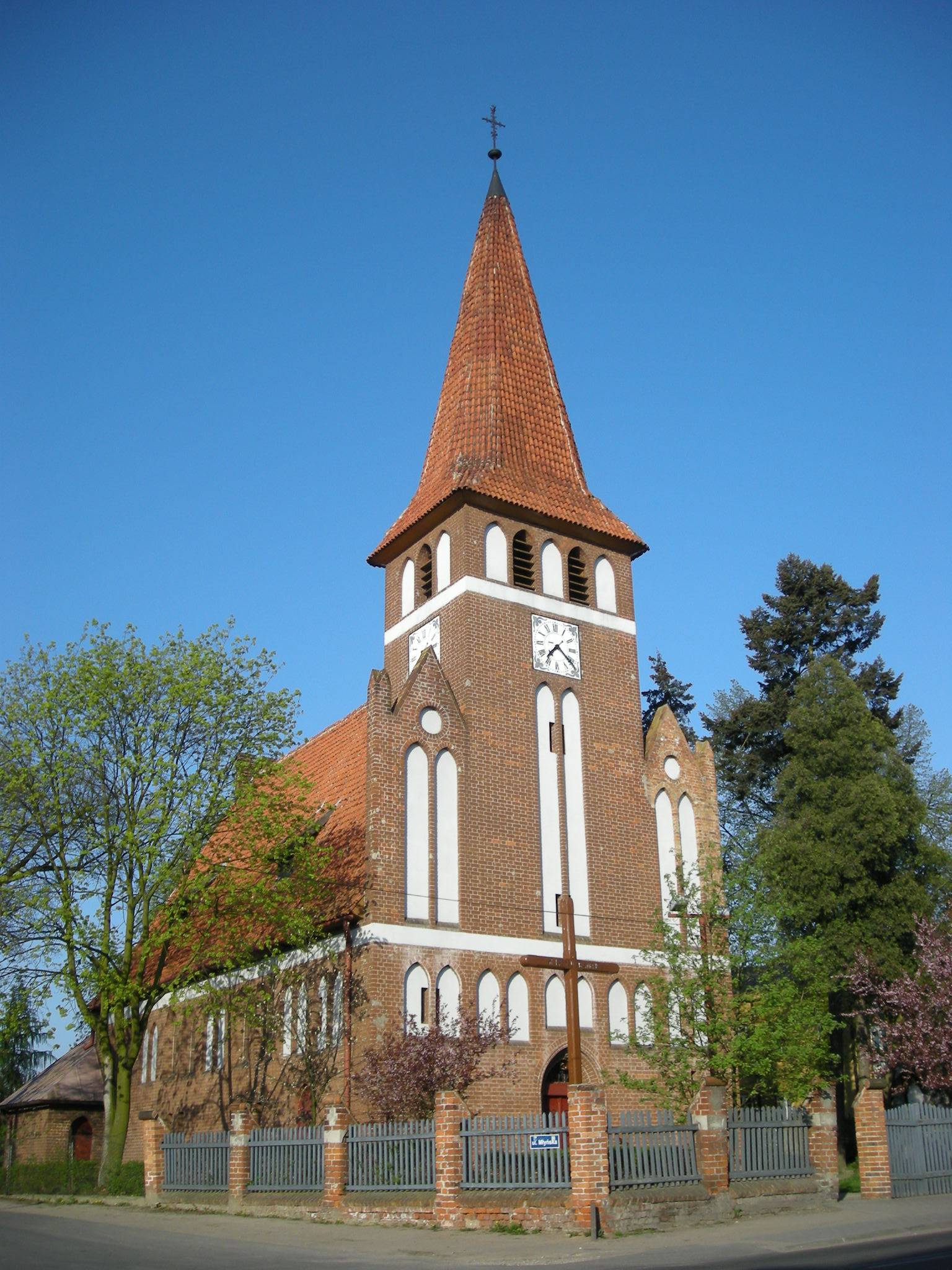
- Ascension of the Holy Virgin Mary Church

- Coat of arms

- Location within Poland
- Coordinates: 53°11′N 18°18′E
- Country: Poland
- Voivodeship: Kuyavian-Pomeranian
- County: Bydgoszcz
- Gmina: Dąbrowa Chełmińska
- Population: 1,400
- Time zone: UTC+1 (CET)
  - Summer (DST): UTC+2 (CEST)
- Vehicle registration: CCH

Dąbrowa Chełmińska [dɔmˈbrɔva xɛu̯ˈmiɲska] is a village in Bydgoszcz County, Kuyavian-Pomeranian Voivodeship, in north-central Poland. It is the seat of the gmina (administrative district) called Gmina Dąbrowa Chełmińska. It is located in Chełmno Land within the historic region of Pomerania.

== History ==
The territory became a part of the emerging Polish state under its first historic ruler Mieszko I in the 10th century. In the 13th century, it passed under control of the Teutonic Knights as a fief of Poland. The village was first mentioned in 1285 as Damerowe. In 1454, King Casimir IV Jagiellon reincorporated it to the Kingdom of Poland. In 1466, following the Thirteen Years' War, the Teutonic Knights renounced claims to the village, and recognized it as part of Poland. It was administratively located in the Chełmno Voivodeship. After the First Partition of Poland in 1772, it was annexed by Prussia. The Peace of Tilsit in July 1807 caused Dąbrowa to become part of the short-lived Polish Duchy of Warsaw; but after the Congress of Vienna in 1815, it fell back to Prussia until 1920; during this time it was called Dombrowken, which was later Germanized to Damerau. Following World War I, Poland regained independence, and Dąbrowa Chełmińska once again became Polish territory in accordance with the Treaty of Versailles.

During the German occupation of Poland (World War II), Dąbrowa Chełmińska was one of the sites of executions of Poles, carried out by the Germans in 1939 as part of the Intelligenzaktion. In 1942, the occupiers also carried out expulsions of Poles, who were sent to transit and concentration camps in the region.

== Nature and recreation ==
As Dąbrowa Chełmińska is only 20 km away from the center of Bydgoszcz, the commune is becoming a popular place to live, especially for commuters. Moreover, the municipality is a popular recreational area due to its location in the middle of forest areas, which occupy almost half of its surface area. Therefore, numerous nature reserves have also been created in and around the village.

== Sports ==
The local football club is LKS Dąbrowa Chełmińska. It competes in the lower leagues.

== Notable residents ==
- Gustav Tornier (1858-1938), a herpetologist working at the Natural History Museum of Berlin
- Ernst Ziehm (1867–1962), President of the Senate of the Free City of Danzig
- Janusz Dzięcioł (1953–2019), Polish parliamentarian
