= Kozielec, Bydgoszcz County =

Kozielec
- Village
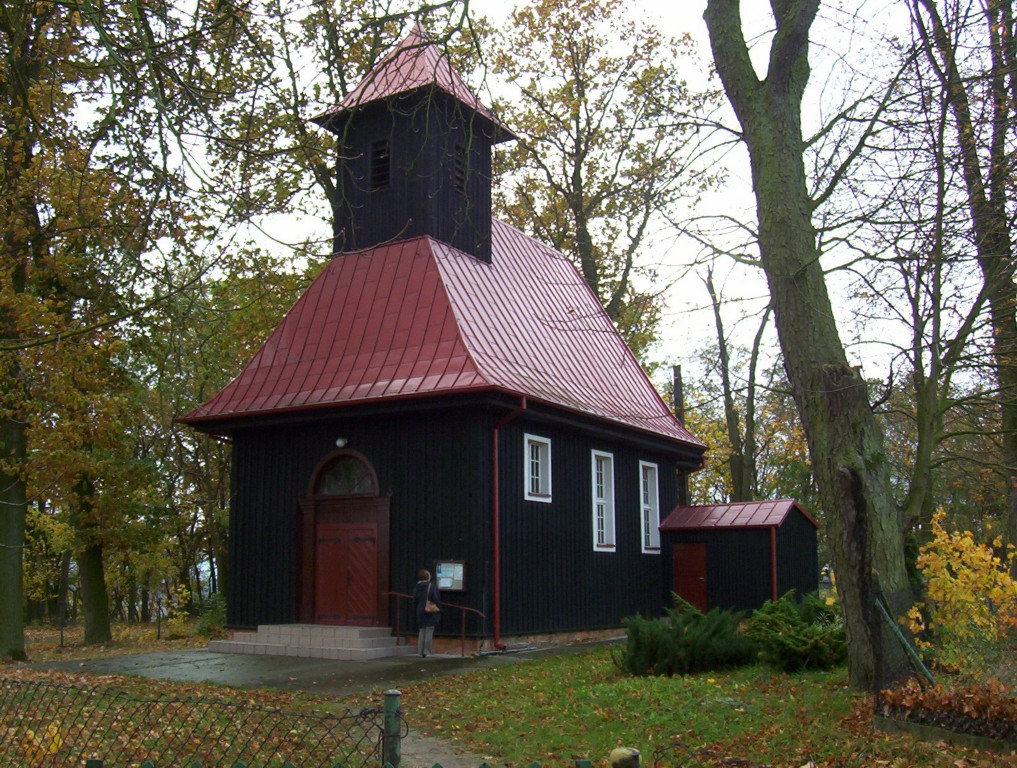
- Immaculate Conception church in Kozielec

- Location within Poland
- Coordinates: 53°14′44″N 18°15′11″E
- Country: Poland
- Voivodeship: Kuyavian-Pomeranian
- County: Bydgoszcz
- Gmina: Dobrcz

Kozielec [kɔˈʑɛlɛt͡s] is a village in the administrative district of Gmina Dobrcz, within Bydgoszcz County, Kuyavian-Pomeranian Voivodeship, in north-central Poland.
