= Sartowice =

Village in Kociewie

- Village
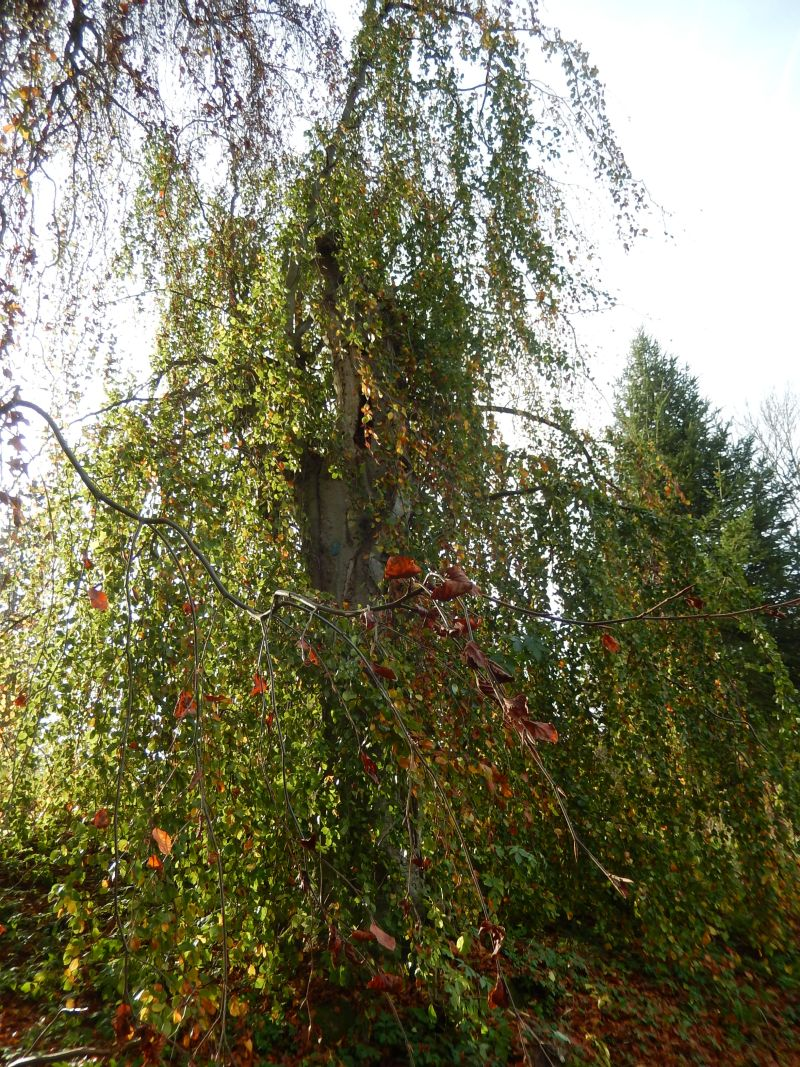
- A weeping beech in the village

- Location within Poland
- Coordinates: 53°26′N 18°34′E
- Country: Poland
- Voivodeship: Kuyavian-Pomeranian
- County: Świecie
- Gmina: Świecie
- Population: 400

Sartowice [sartɔˈvit͡sɛ] is a village in the administrative district of Gmina Świecie, within Świecie County, Kuyavian-Pomeranian Voivodeship, in north-central Poland.

The village has an old wooden church and a manor house.
