= Church of St. Mary Magdalene, Wyszogród =

Former Catholic church in Wyszogród, Poland

Church of St. Mary Magdalene
- Kościół św. Marii Magdaleny (Polish)
- Church of St. Mary Magdalene
- 53°8′25″N 18°9′12″E
- Location: Wyszogród, Bydgoszcz
- Country: Poland
- Denomination: Roman Catholic

History
- Status: Parish church, from around 1430 filial church
- Dedication: Mary Magdalene
- Consecrated: 997, first written mention 1198

Architecture
- Completed: 10th–12th century
- Demolished: c. 1765

Specifications
- Materials: Wood

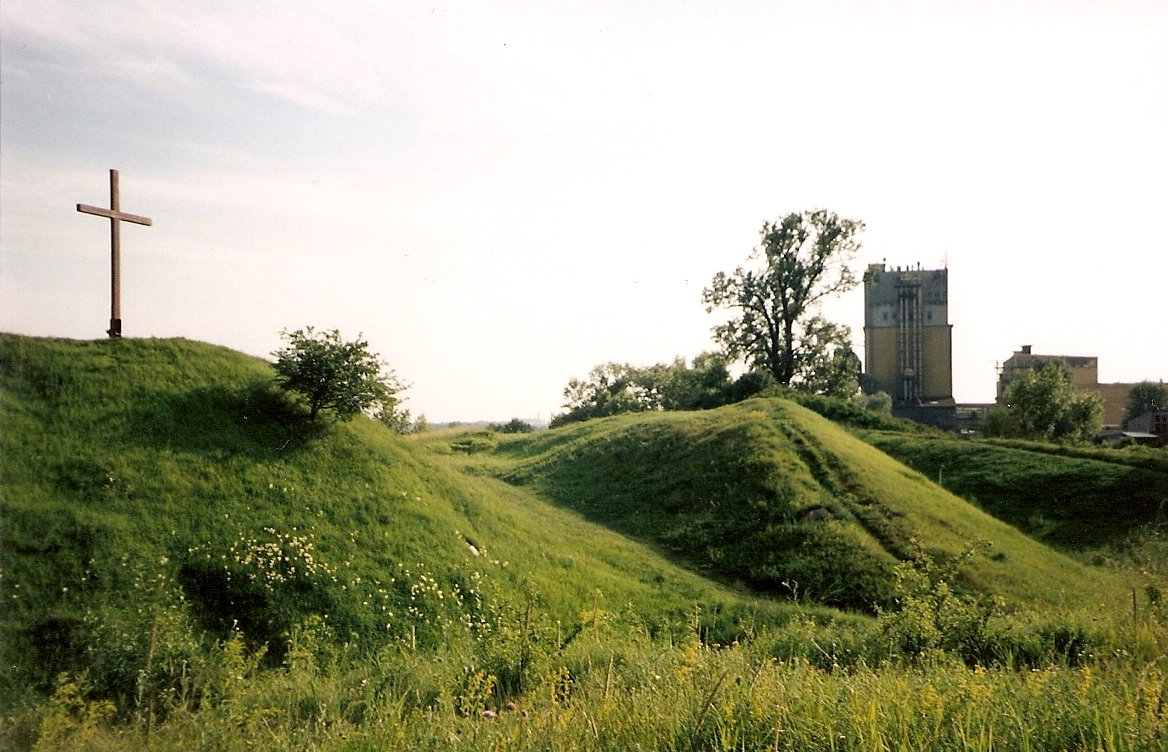
Remains of the Wyszogród hillfort in Bydgoszcz

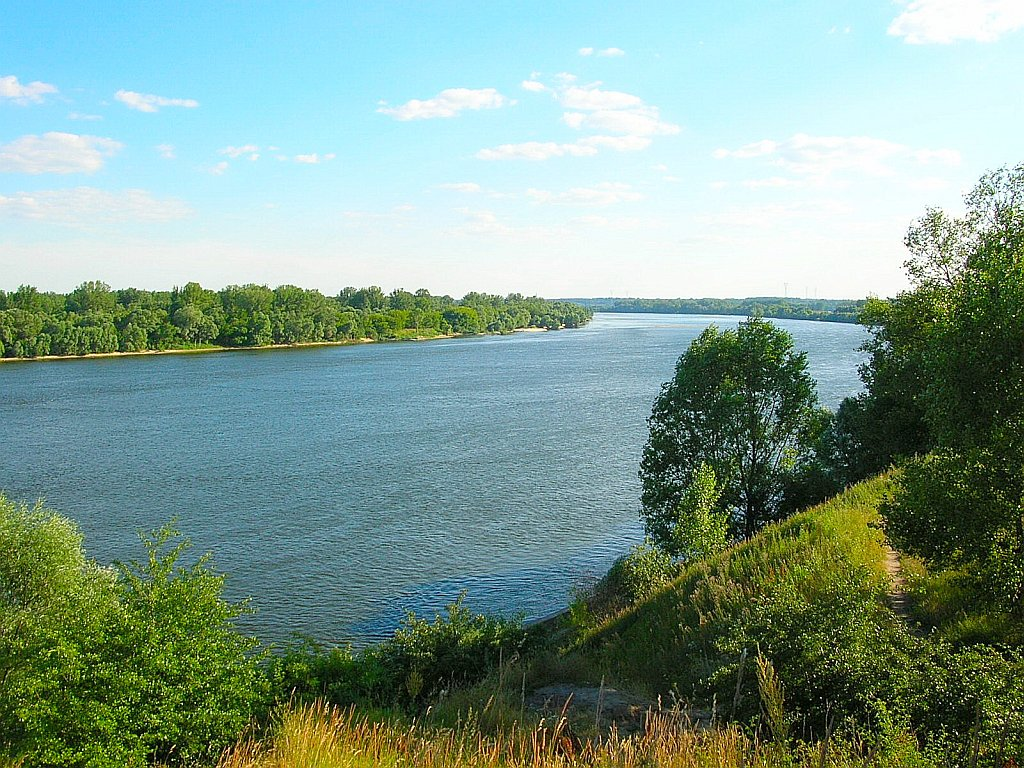
View from the hillfort towards the lower Vistula river bend

The Church of St. Mary Magdalene was located near the early medieval Wyszogród hillfort in present-day Bydgoszcz, Poland. It was the oldest parish church constructed within the current city limits of Bydgoszcz and its surrounding county. It was also one of the oldest churches in the region. The precise location of the church remains unknown, as does its architectural design.

== History ==
=== Legend ===
According to legend, the church's origins are linked to the visit of Adalbert of Prague to Wyszogród in April 997. During his missionary journey to the Prussians, he reportedly stayed for several days with a local count, preaching, baptizing, and consecrating a newly built chapel dedicated to Saint Mary Magdalene. This legend is reflected in 16th-century church documents. No scientific evidence confirms the existence of the hillfort in the late 10th century, but Wyszogród (either as a stronghold or settlement) lay on Adalbert's route to Prussia, whether he traveled by land or along the Vistula river.

=== Parish church ===
Regardless of the legend's veracity, the Wyszogród church appears in written records relatively early. The stronghold was captured in 1113 by Bolesław III Wrymouth, who incorporated it into Polish lands, as noted in the chronicle of Gallus Anonymus. Subsequently, Wyszogród was granted as a benefice to the wealthy noble Janusz Wojsławic of the Pował family. It is believed that either Duke Bolesław or, more likely, Janusz Wojsławic founded the church (or constructed a new building for it) and endowed it with land holdings.

The church likely became a parish in the 12th century, established as a noble foundation. This is suggested by the presence of a group of canons at the church and its endowment with tithings from the villages of Orłowo and Sielce, owned by the Pował family. The first mention of a parson, Jan of Wyszogród, dates to 1198, when he participated in the consecration of a church in Świecie.

The Wyszogród church served as a parish church for a vast area, providing pastoral care for the extensive territory of the Pował family's domain, later transformed into the Wyszogród castellania. This domain stretched along both banks of the Vistula and the lower Brda, from Solec Kujawski in the south to Dobrcz and Niewieścin in the north. Given the sparse settlement and demographic conditions of northern Kuyavia, the church's influence likely extended minimally to the boundaries of this domain and the later castellany. For at least a century, it was the only parish church in the region, with no other churches of similar rank between it and those in Świecie and Inowrocław. Thus, it naturally assumed pastoral care for the entire local population.

The first direct written mention of the Wyszogród parish dates to 1325. At that time, it encompassed eight localities: Jasiniec, Siernieczek, Jarużyn, Czersko Polskie, Strzelce, Włóki, Osielsko, and Żołędowo.

=== Filial church ===
Abandoned in the 15th century, the Wyszogród church stood for over 150 years on open fields near the Vistula. A 1582 parish visitation described it as deserted, ruined, and open, serving as an animal enclosure. An old cemetery and ossuary were located nearby. Despite its condition, three indulgence masses were held annually in the church by the late 16th century, though their dates are unknown. The church's decline resulted from the shift of the parish's center to Fordon.

In 1591, Fordon parishioners built a new wooden church covered with shingles, dedicated to the same saint, about 50 meters west of the stronghold. It stood empty, with masses celebrated several times a year using a portable altar. All endowments and income were transferred to the Church of St. NIcholas. A 1725 parish review described the Wyszogród church as abandoned, with a partially rotten roof and walls. Plans for its repair were never realized. Instead, 180 roof tiles were removed from its roof to support church construction in Fordon, hastening its collapse. An untended, unfenced cemetery surrounded the church in the early 18th century.

The final mention of the church comes from a 1763 visitation, which described it as unusable and in ruins. Several graves and a partially wooden ossuary remained, but no burials had occurred there by the time of the visitation. Remnants of the church persisted into the 19th century.

The absence of archaeological studies, written records, maps, or iconographic sources prevents a precise reconstruction of the church's architecture. It is known that the three successive church buildings – erected in the 12th century, 1349, and 1591 – were wooden and modest in size.

== See also ==
- History of Bydgoszcz
