= Wałdowo =

Wałdowo may refer to the following places in Poland:

- Wałdowo, Świecie County (north-central Poland)
- Wałdowo, Sępólno County (north-central Poland)
- Wałdowo, Pomeranian Voivodeship (north Poland)
- Wałdowo, Iława County (north-east Poland)
- Wałdowo, Ostróda County (north-east Poland)
