= Bagniewko =

Bagniewko refers to the following places in Poland:

- Bagniewko, Kuyavian-Pomeranian Voivodeship
- Bagniewko, West Pomeranian Voivodeship
