= Kusowo =

Kusowo may refer to the following places:

- Kusowo, Kuyavian-Pomeranian Voivodeship (north-central Poland)
- Kusowo, Pomeranian Voivodeship (north Poland)
- Kusowo, West Pomeranian Voivodeship (north-west Poland)
