= Parlin =

Parlin may refer to:

== Locations ==
- Parlin, Mogilno County, in Kuyavian-Pomeranian Voivodeship (north-central Poland)
- Parlin, Świecie County, in Kuyavian-Pomeranian Voivodeship (north-central Poland)
- Parlin, Płońsk County, in Masovian Voivodeship (east-central Poland)
- Parlin, Żuromin County, in Masovian Voivodeship (east-central Poland)
- Parlin, New Jersey, in the United States

== People ==
- Parlin (surname)
