= Karczemka =

Karczemka may refer to the following places:

- Karczemka, Greater Poland Voivodeship (west-central Poland)
- Karczemka, Bydgoszcz County in Kuyavian-Pomeranian Voivodeship (north-central Poland)
- Karczemka, Lubusz Voivodeship (west Poland)
- Karczemka, Warmian-Masurian Voivodeship (north Poland)
