= Konstantowo =

Konstantowo may refer to the following places in Kuyavian-Pomeranian Voivodeship, Poland:

- Konstantowo, Nakło County
- Konstantowo, Świecie County
