= Byliny =

Byliny may refer to:

- Byliny, plural of bylina, a type of Russian oral epic poem
- Byliny, Warmian-Masurian Voivodeship (north Poland)
