= Bagniewo =

Bagniewo may refer to:

- Bagniewo, Kuyavian-Pomeranian Voivodeship (north-central Poland)
- Bagniewo, Lubusz Voivodeship (west Poland)
- Bagniewo, Pomeranian Voivodeship (north Poland)
