= Linowiec =

Linowiec may refer to the following places:

- Linowiec, Greater Poland Voivodeship (west-central Poland)
- Linowiec, Kuyavian-Pomeranian Voivodeship (north-central Poland)
- Linówiec, Kuyavian-Pomeranian Voivodeship (north-central Poland)
- Linowiec, Pomeranian Voivodeship (north Poland)
- Linowiec, Warmian-Masurian Voivodeship (north Poland)
