= Mirowice =

Mirowice may refer to the following places:

- Mirowice, Kuyavian-Pomeranian Voivodeship (north-central Poland)
- Mirowice, Masovian Voivodeship (east-central Poland)
- Mirowice, Pomeranian Voivodeship (north Poland)
