= Gmina Kisielice =

Gmina Kisielice Kisielice Commune
- Gmina
- Coat of arms
- Interactive map of Gmina Kisielice
- Coordinates (Kisielice): 53°36′25″N 19°15′34″E
- Country: Poland
- Voivodeship: Warmian-Masurian
- County: Iława
- Seat: Kisielice

Area
  - Total: 172.8 km^{2} (66.7 sq mi)

Population (2006)
  - Total: 6,232
  - Density: 36.06/km^{2} (93.41/sq mi)
  - Urban: 2,208
  - Rural: 4,024

Gmina Kisielice is an urban-rural gmina (administrative district) in Iława County, Warmian-Masurian Voivodeship, in northern Poland. Its seat is the town of Kisielice, which lies approximately 21 kilometres (13 mi) west of Iława and 85 km (53 mi) west of the regional capital Olsztyn.

The gmina covers an area of 172.8 square kilometres (66.7 sq mi), and as of 2006 its total population is 6,232 (out of which the population of Kisielice amounts to 2,208, and the population of the rural part of the gmina is 4,024).

== Villages ==
Apart from the town of Kisielice, Gmina Kisielice contains the villages and settlements of Biskupiczki, Butowo, Byliny, Galinowo, Goryń, Jędrychowo, Kantowo, Klimy, Krzywka, Łęgowo, Limża, Łodygowo, Nowy Folwark, Ogrodzieniec, Pławty Wielkie, Sobiewola, Stary Folwark, Trupel, Wałdowo and Wola.

== Neighbouring gminas ==
Gmina Kisielice is bordered by the gminas of Biskupiec, Gardeja, Iława, Łasin, Prabuty and Susz.
