= Trzęsacz, Kuyavian-Pomeranian Voivodeship =

Trzęsacz
- Village
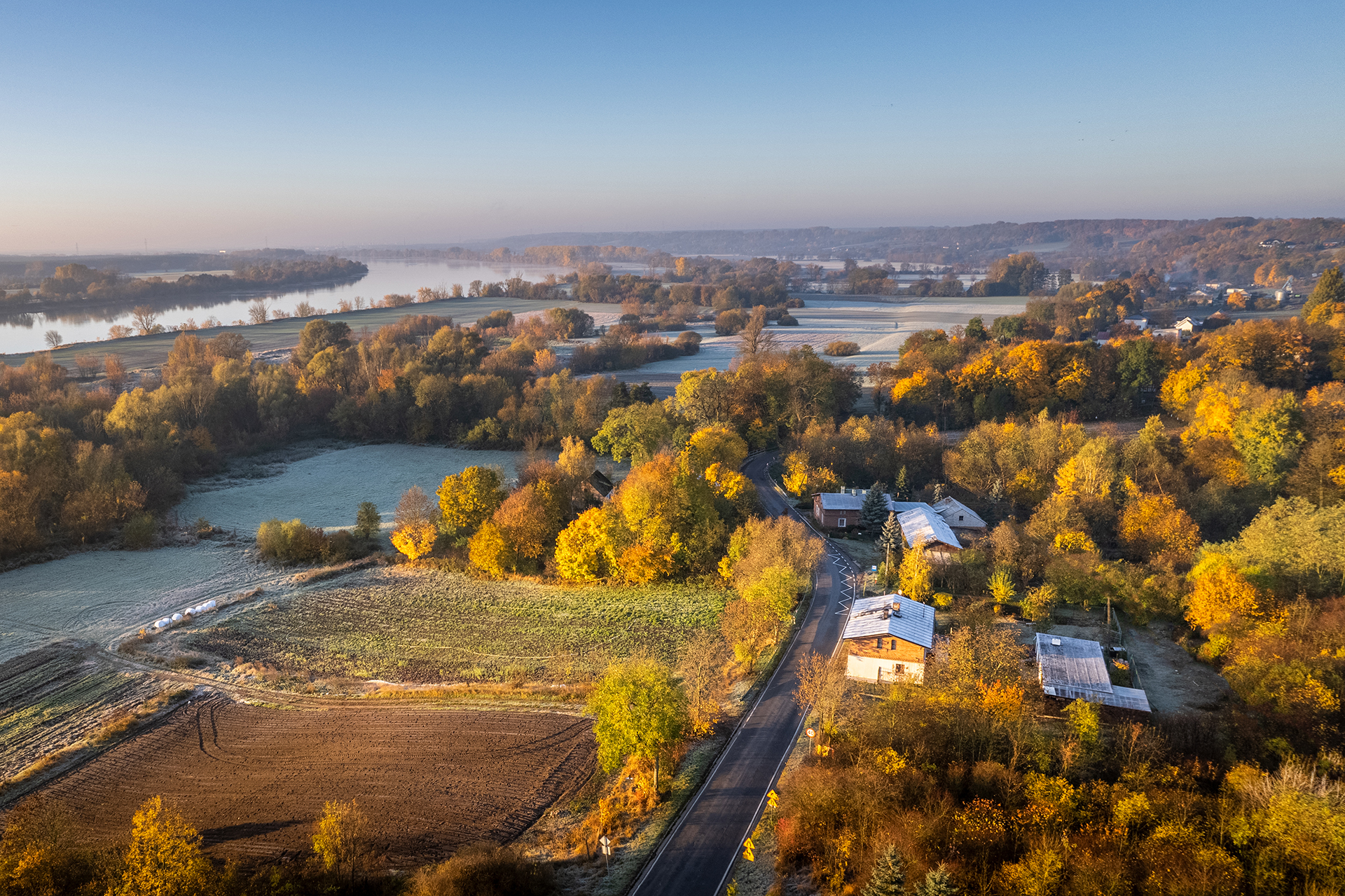

- Location within Poland
- Coordinates: 53°14′13″N 18°12′59″E
- Country: Poland
- Voivodeship: Kuyavian-Pomeranian
- County: Bydgoszcz
- Gmina: Dobrcz
- Time zone: UTC+1 (CET)
  - Summer (DST): UTC+2 (CEST)
- Vehicle registration: CBY

Trzęsacz [ˈtʂɛ̃sat͡ʂ] is a village in the administrative district of Gmina Dobrcz, within Bydgoszcz County, Kuyavian-Pomeranian Voivodeship, in north-central Poland.
