= Augustowo, Bydgoszcz County =

Augustowo
- Village
- Location within Poland
- Coordinates: 53°13′39″N 18°5′42″E
- Country: Poland
- Voivodeship: Kuyavian-Pomeranian
- County: Bydgoszcz
- Gmina: Dobrcz
- Population: 190

Augustowo [au̯ɡusˈtɔvɔ] is a village in the administrative district of Gmina Dobrcz, within Bydgoszcz County, Kuyavian-Pomeranian Voivodeship, in north-central Poland.
