= Zła Wieś, Kuyavian-Pomeranian Voivodeship =

Zła Wieś
- Village
- Location within Poland
- Coordinates: 53°14′16″N 18°13′55″E
- Country: Poland
- Voivodeship: Kuyavian-Pomeranian
- County: Bydgoszcz
- Gmina: Dobrcz
- Population: 20

Zła Wieś [ˈzwa ˈvjɛɕ] is a village in the administrative district of Gmina Dobrcz, within Bydgoszcz County, Kuyavian-Pomeranian Voivodeship, in north-central Poland.
