= Krzywka, Warmian-Masurian Voivodeship =

Krzywka
- Village
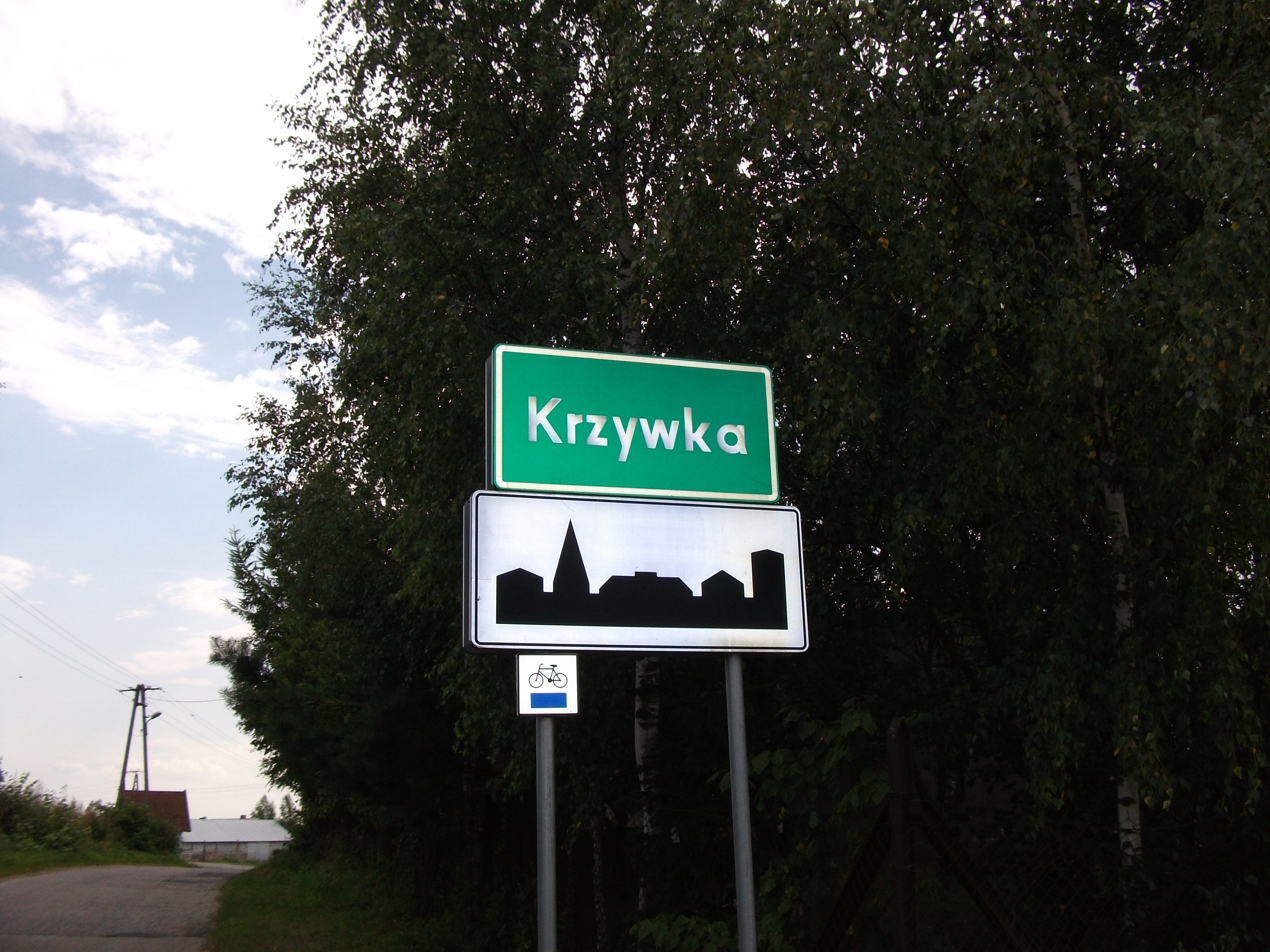
- Road sign in Krzywka

- Location within Poland
- Coordinates: 53°32′51″N 19°13′15″E
- Country: Poland
- Voivodeship: Warmian-Masurian
- County: Iława
- Gmina: Kisielice

Krzywka [ˈkʂɨfka] is a village in the administrative district of Gmina Kisielice, within Iława County, Warmian-Masurian Voivodeship, in northern Poland.
