= Nowy Folwark, Iława County =

Nowy Folwark
- Village
- Location within Poland
- Coordinates: 53°38′49″N 19°19′14″E
- Country: Poland
- Voivodeship: Warmian-Masurian
- County: Iława
- Gmina: Kisielice

Nowy Folwark [ˈnɔvɨ ˈfɔlvark] is a village in the administrative district of Gmina Kisielice, within Iława County, Warmian-Masurian Voivodeship, in northern Poland.
