= Zbrachlin, Świecie County =

Zbrachlin
- Village
- Location within Poland
- Coordinates: 53°19′N 18°15′E
- Country: Poland
- Voivodeship: Kuyavian-Pomeranian
- County: Świecie
- Gmina: Pruszcz

Zbrachlin [ˈzbraxlin] is a village in the administrative district of Gmina Pruszcz, within Świecie County, Kuyavian-Pomeranian Voivodeship, in north-central Poland.
