= Trupel =

- Village
- Location within Poland
- Coordinates: 53°35′N 19°22′E
- Country: Poland
- Voivodeship: Warmian-Masurian
- County: Iława
- Gmina: Kisielice
- Website: http://cihuomt.fm.interia.pl/strony/trupel.html

Trupel [ˈtrupɛl] is a village in the administrative district of Gmina Kisielice, within Iława County, Warmian-Masurian Voivodeship, in northern Poland.
