= Luszkówko =

- Village
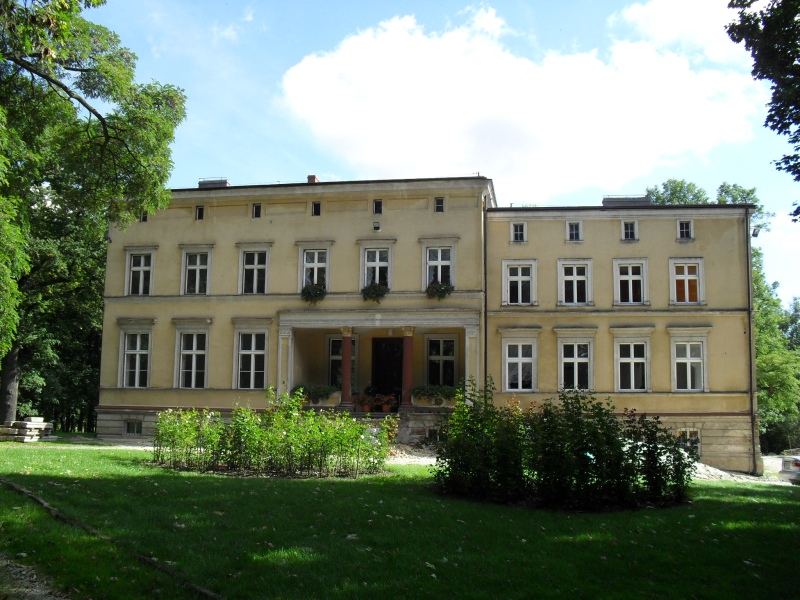
- Luszkówko Palace

- Location within Poland
- Coordinates: 53°19′34″N 18°15′33″E
- Country: Poland
- Voivodeship: Kuyavian-Pomeranian
- County: Świecie
- Gmina: Pruszcz
- Time zone: UTC+1 (CET)
  - Summer (DST): UTC+2 (CEST)
- Vehicle registration: CSW

Luszkówko [luʂˈkufkɔ] is a village in the administrative district of Gmina Pruszcz, within Świecie County, Kuyavian-Pomeranian Voivodeship, in north-central Poland.

== History ==
Luszkówko was a private village owned by various Polish nobles, incl. the Wulkowski family of Chomąto coat of arms and Luszkowski family of Dryja coat of arms, administratively located in the Świecie County in the Pomeranian Voivodeship of the Kingdom of Poland. It was annexed by Prussia in the First Partition of Poland in 1772. Following World War I, Poland regained independence and control of the village. According to the 1921 census, the village had a population of 204, 98.5% Polish.

During the German occupation of Poland (World War II), the local forest was the site of a massacre of about 1,000 mentally ill people from the psychiatric hospital in nearby Świecie, perpetrated by the Germans between September 1939 and January 1940. Poles from the county arrested during the Intelligenzaktion were also massacred nearby by the Volksdeutscher Selbstschutz.

== Transport ==
The Polish S5 highway runs nearby, east of the village.
