= Trzeciewiec =

- Village
- Location within Poland
- Coordinates: 53°16′N 18°12′E
- Country: Poland
- Voivodeship: Kuyavian-Pomeranian
- County: Bydgoszcz
- Gmina: Dobrcz
- Population: 520

Trzeciewiec [tʂɛˈt͡ɕɛvjɛt͡s] is a village in the administrative district of Gmina Dobrcz, within Bydgoszcz County, Kuyavian-Pomeranian Voivodeship, in north-central Poland.

Near Trzeciewiec, there is a 320 metres tall mast for FM-/TV-broadcasting, which was built in 1962.
