= Wudzyn =

- Village
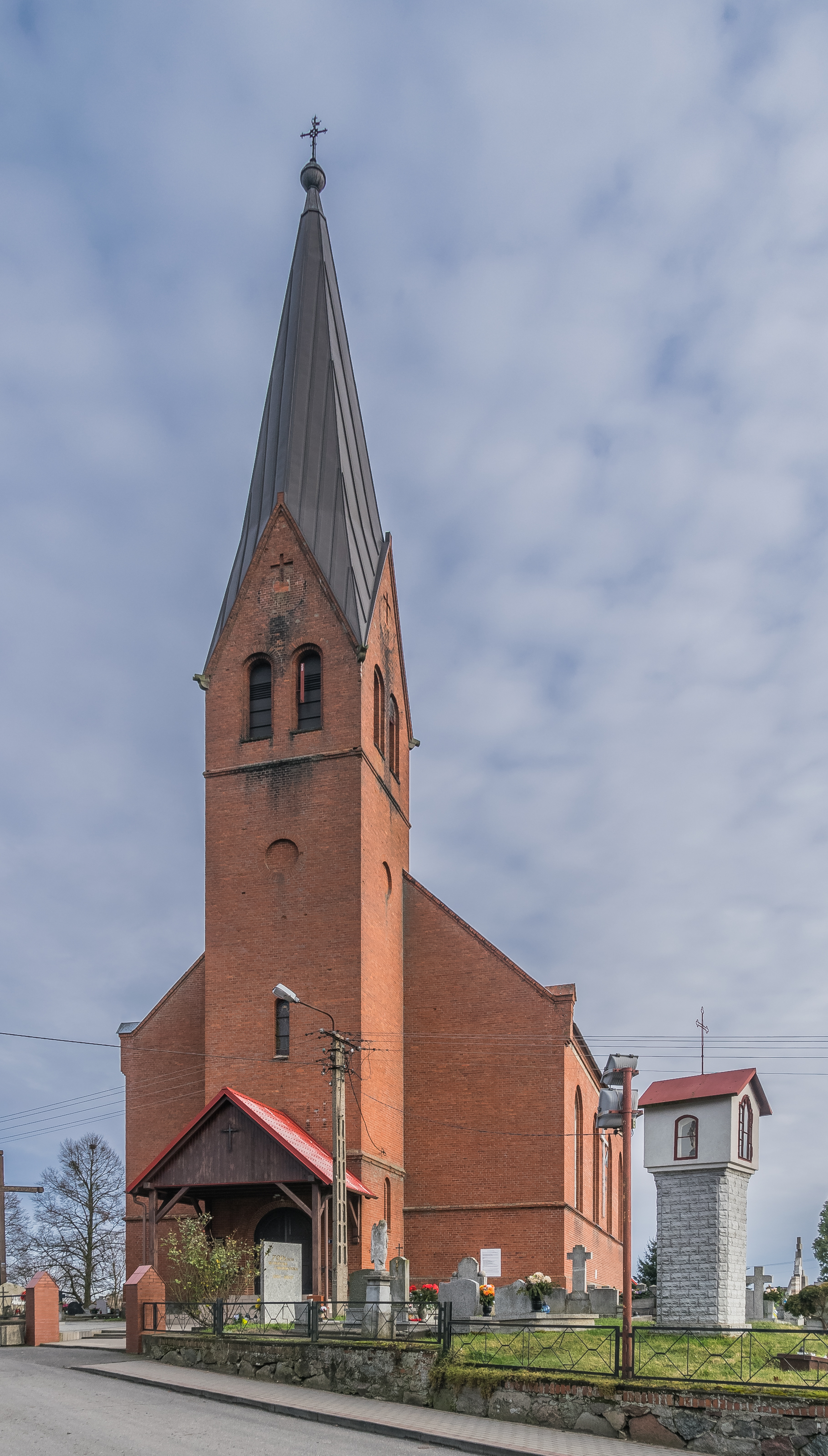
- Saint Barbara church in Wudzyn

- Location within Poland
- Coordinates: 53°19′N 18°5′E
- Country: Poland
- Voivodeship: Kuyavian-Pomeranian
- County: Bydgoszcz
- Gmina: Dobrcz
- Time zone: UTC+1 (CET)
  - Summer (DST): UTC+2 (CEST)
- Vehicle registration: CBY
- Primary airport: Bydgoszcz Ignacy Jan Paderewski Airport

Wudzyn [ˈvud͡zɨn] is a village in the administrative district of Gmina Dobrcz, within Bydgoszcz County, Kuyavian-Pomeranian Voivodeship, in north-central Poland. It is located in the historic region of Kuyavia.

== History ==
During the German occupation (World War II), in 1939, the occupiers carried out arrests of local Poles, who were then murdered by the German Einsatzkommando 16 near Otorowo as part of the Intelligenzaktion. Among the victims was local sołtys (head of local administration) Teofil Arczyński. In 1944, the Germans burned the bodies of the victims in attempt to cover up the crime. In 1941, the occupiers also carried out expulsions of Poles, whose farms were then handed over to German colonists as part of the Lebensraum policy.
