= Stronno =

- Village
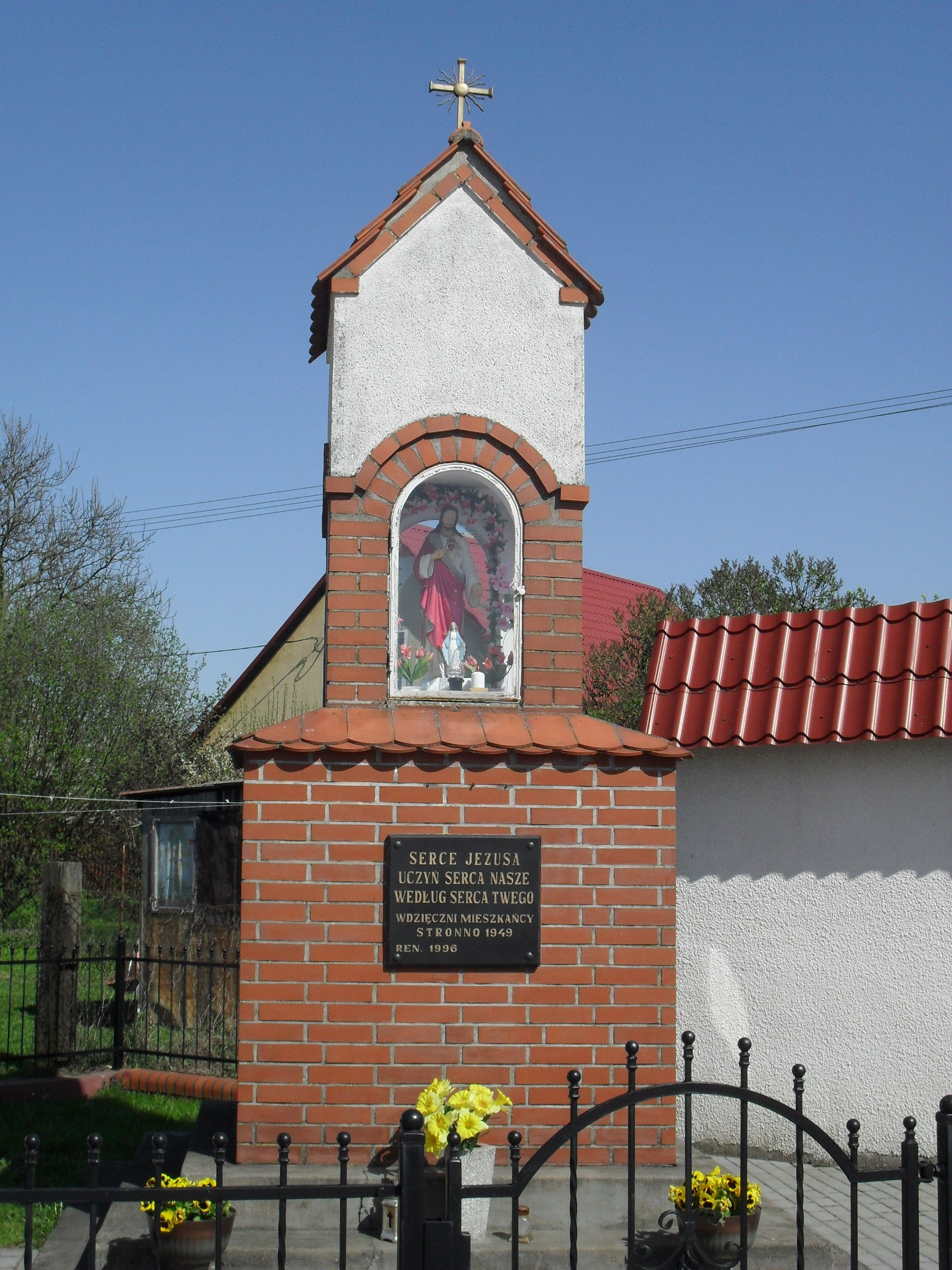
- Wayside shrine in Stronno

- Location within Poland
- Coordinates: 53°17′N 18°4′E
- Country: Poland
- Voivodeship: Kuyavian-Pomeranian
- County: Bydgoszcz
- Gmina: Dobrcz
- First mentioned: 1315
- Population: 850
- Time zone: UTC+1 (CET)
  - Summer (DST): UTC+2 (CEST)
- Vehicle registration: CBY
- Primary airport: Bydgoszcz Ignacy Jan Paderewski Airport

Stronno [ˈstrɔnnɔ] is a village in the administrative district of Gmina Dobrcz, within Bydgoszcz County, Kuyavian-Pomeranian Voivodeship, in north-central Poland. It is located in the historic region of Kuyavia.

== History ==
The oldest known mention of the village comes from 1315.

On 3–4 September 1939, during the German invasion of Poland which started World War II, the Battle of Stronno was fought nearby between the invading Germans and the Poles. During the subsequent German occupation, in 1939, the occupiers carried out arrests of local Poles, who were then murdered by the German Einsatzkommando 16 near Otorowo as part of the Intelligenzaktion. In 1944, the Germans burned the bodies of the victims in attempt to cover up the crime. In 1940, the occupiers also carried out expulsions of Poles, whose farms were then handed over to German colonists as part of the Lebensraum policy. Expelled Poles were placed in a transit camp in Toruń, and then deported either to the General Government (German-occupied central Poland) or to forced labour in Germany.
