= Rudki, Kuyavian-Pomeranian Voivodeship =

Village in Kuyavia

Rudki
- Village
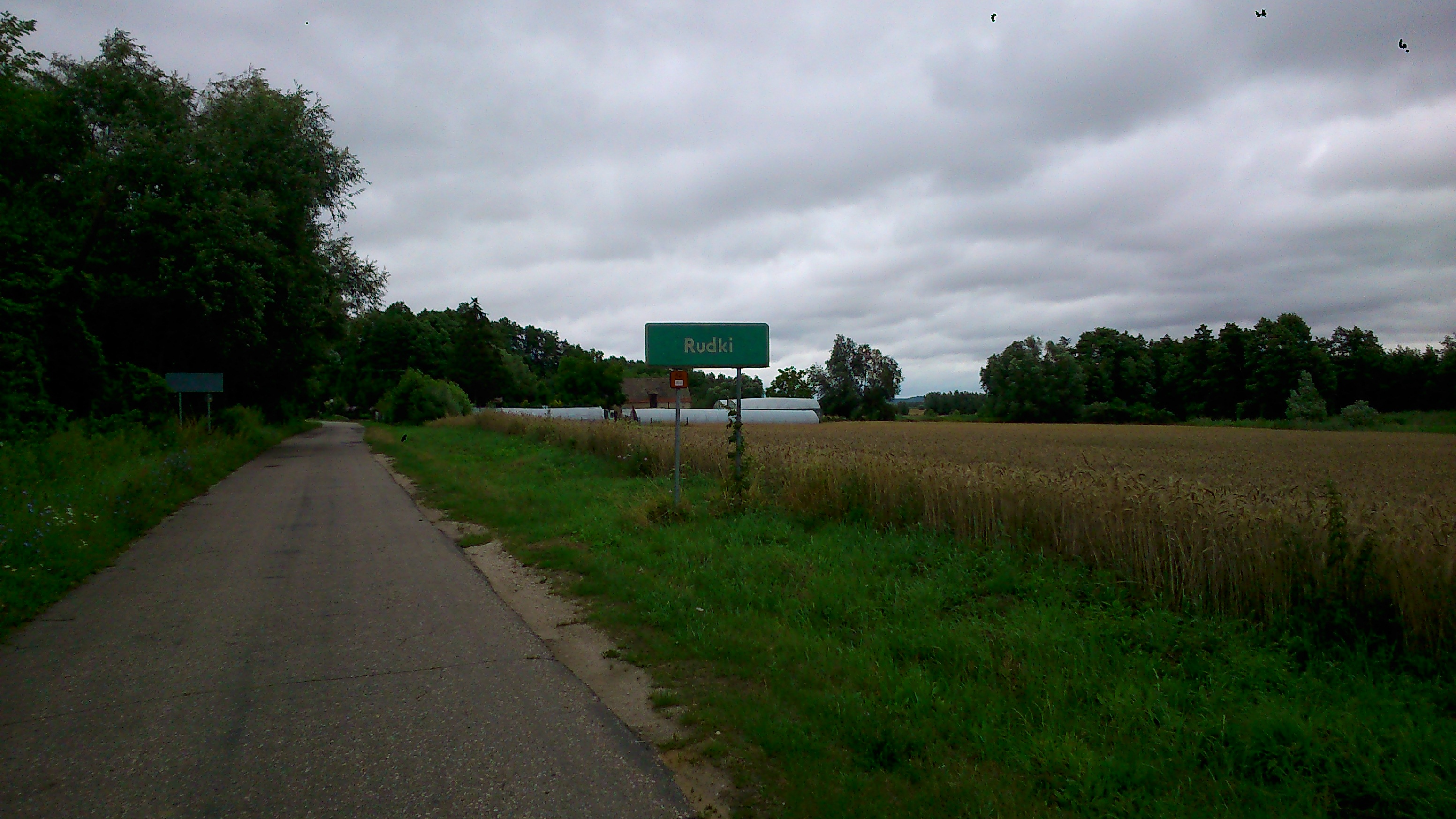
- Entrance to Rudki

- Location within Poland
- Coordinates: 53°17′04″N 18°17′16″E
- Country: Poland
- Voivodeship: Kuyavian-Pomeranian
- County: Świecie
- Gmina: Pruszcz

Rudki [ˈrutki] is a village in the administrative district of Gmina Pruszcz, within Świecie County, Kuyavian-Pomeranian Voivodeship, in north-central Poland.
