= Sobiewola =

- Village
- Location within Poland
- Coordinates: 53°35′21″N 19°14′39″E
- Country: Poland
- Voivodeship: Warmian-Masurian
- County: Iława
- Gmina: Kisielice

Sobiewola [sɔbjɛˈvɔla] is a village in the administrative district of Gmina Kisielice, within Iława County, Warmian-Masurian Voivodeship, in northern Poland.
