= Wola, Iława County =

Wola
- Village
- Location within Poland
- Coordinates: 53°35′01″N 19°19′21″E
- Country: Poland
- Voivodeship: Warmian-Masurian
- County: Iława
- Gmina: Kisielice

Wola [ˈvɔla] is a village in the administrative district of Gmina Kisielice, within Iława County, Warmian-Masurian Voivodeship, in northern Poland.
