= Nekla, Kuyavian-Pomeranian Voivodeship =

Nekla
- Village
- Location within Poland
- Coordinates: 53°14′N 18°4′E
- Country: Poland
- Voivodeship: Kuyavian-Pomeranian
- County: Bydgoszcz
- Gmina: Dobrcz

Nekla [ˈnɛkla] is a village in the administrative district of Gmina Dobrcz, within Bydgoszcz County, Kuyavian-Pomeranian Voivodeship, in north-central Poland.
