= Gmina Pruszcz =

Gmina Pruszcz Pruszcz Commune
- Gmina
- Flag Coat of arms
- Interactive map of Gmina Pruszcz
- Coordinates (Pruszcz): 53°19′46″N 18°11′55″E
- Country: Poland
- Voivodeship: Kuyavian-Pomeranian
- County: Świecie
- Seat: Pruszcz

Area
  - Total: 141.96 km^{2} (54.81 sq mi)

Population (2006)
  - Total: 9,232
  - Density: 65.03/km^{2} (168.4/sq mi)
- Website: http://www.pruszcz.pl

Gmina Pruszcz is an urban-rural gmina (administrative district) in Świecie County, Kuyavian-Pomeranian Voivodeship, in north-central Poland. Its seat is the town of Pruszcz, which lies approximately 19 kilometres (12 mi) south-west of Świecie and 28 km (17 mi) north-east of Bydgoszcz.

The gmina covers an area of 141.96 square kilometres (54.8 sq mi), and as of 2006 its total population is 9,232.

== Villages ==
Gmina Pruszcz contains the town of Pruszcz, and villages and settlements of Bagniewko, Bagniewo, Brzeźno, Cieleszyn, Gołuszyce, Grabówko, Grabowo, Konstantowo, Łaszewo, Łowin, Łowinek, Luszkówko, Luszkowo, Małociechowo, Mirowice, Nieciszewo, Niewieścin, Parlin, Rudki, Serock, Topolno, Trępel, Wałdowo, Zawada and Zbrachlin.

== Neighbouring gminas ==
Gmina Pruszcz is bordered by the gminas of Bukowiec, Chełmno, Dobrcz, Koronowo, Świecie, Świekatowo and Unisław.
