= Zawada, Gmina Pruszcz =

Zawada
- Village
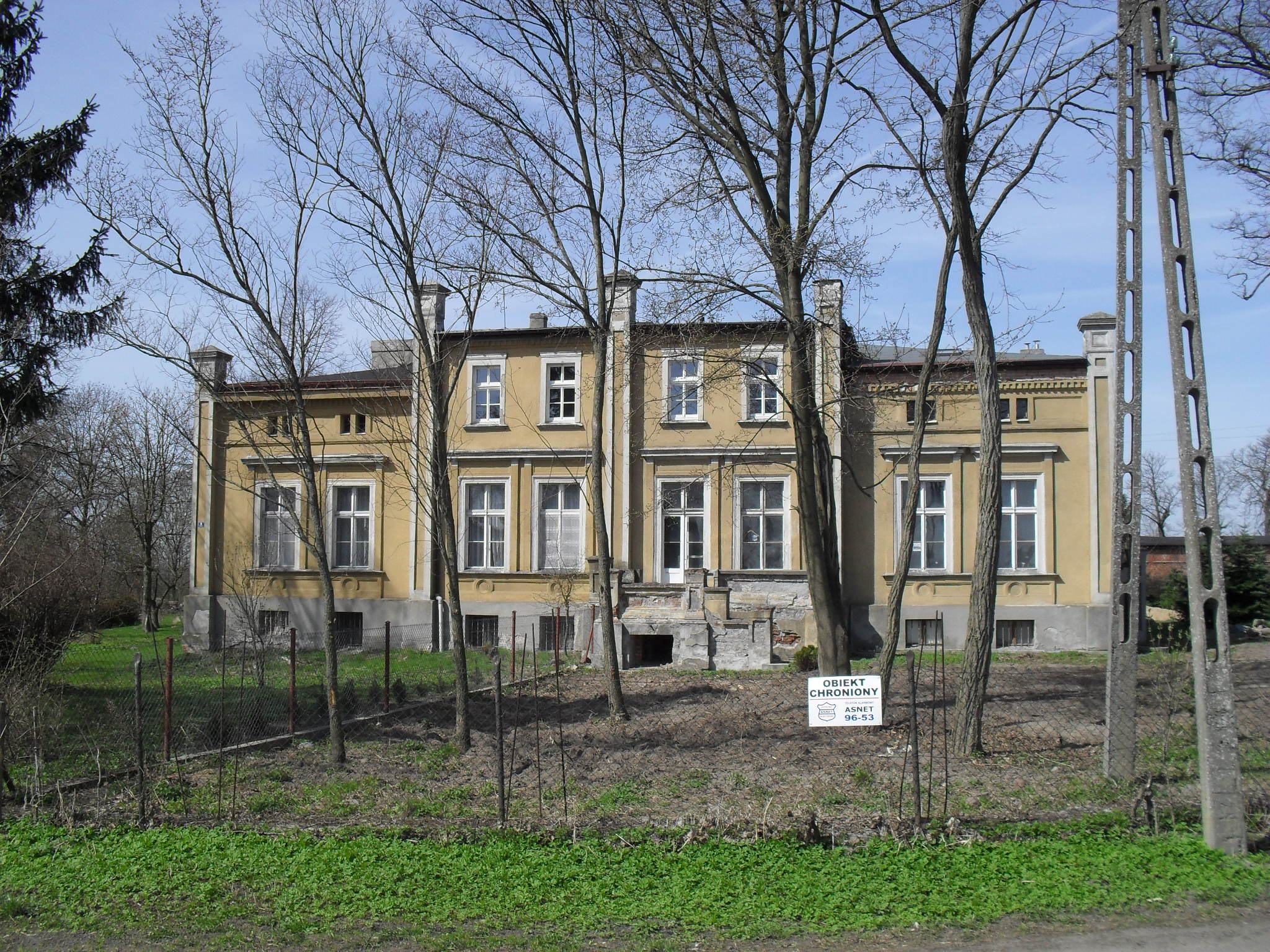
- Old manor house

- Location within Poland
- Coordinates: 53°17′19″N 18°11′13″E
- Country: Poland
- Voivodeship: Kuyavian-Pomeranian
- County: Świecie
- Gmina: Pruszcz
- Vehicle registration: CSW

Zawada [zaˈvada] is a village in the administrative district of Gmina Pruszcz, within Świecie County, Kuyavian-Pomeranian Voivodeship, in north-central Poland.

== History ==
Zawada was a private village of Polish nobility, administratively located in the Świecie County in the Pomeranian Voivodeship of the Kingdom of Poland.

Following the joint German-Soviet invasion of Poland, which started World War II in September 1939, Pruszcz was occupied by Germany until 1945. In 1941, the occupiers carried out expulsions of Poles, who were deported to transit camps in Tczew and Smukała, Bydgoszcz, while their houses were handed over to German colonists as part of the Lebensraum policy.
