= Łaszewo, Świecie County =

Łaszewo
- Village
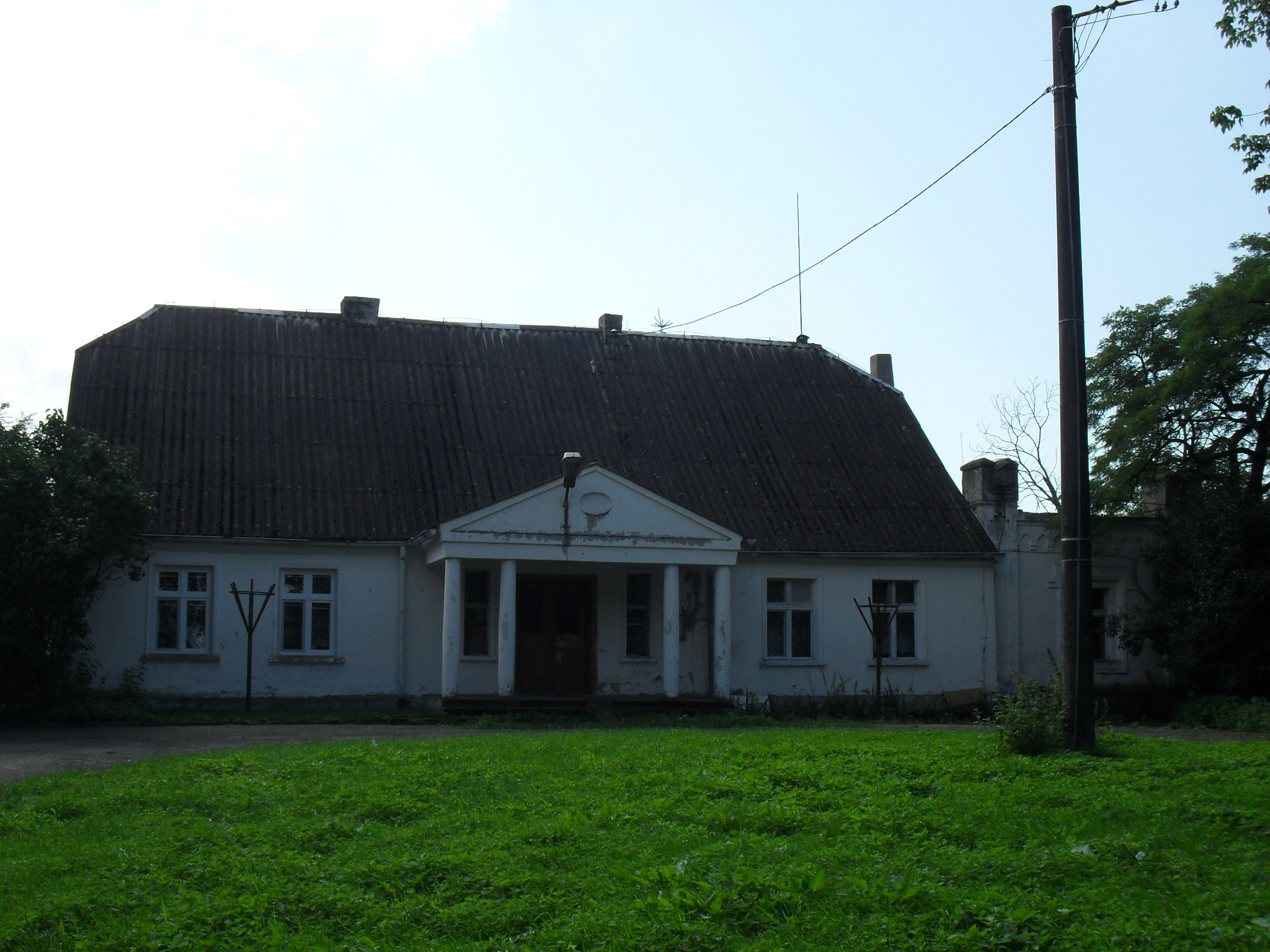

- Location within Poland
- Coordinates: 53°14′52″N 19°32′43″E
- Country: Poland
- Voivodeship: Kuyavian-Pomeranian
- County: Świecie
- Gmina: Pruszcz

Łaszewo [waˈʂɛvɔ] is a village in the administrative district of Gmina Pruszcz, within Świecie County, Kuyavian-Pomeranian Voivodeship, in north-central Poland.
