= Trępel =

- Village
- Location within Poland
- Coordinates: 53°16′58″N 18°18′21″E
- Country: Poland
- Voivodeship: Kuyavian-Pomeranian
- County: Świecie
- Gmina: Pruszcz

Trępel [ˈtrɛmpɛl] is a village in the administrative district of Gmina Pruszcz, within Świecie County, Kuyavian-Pomeranian Voivodeship, in north-central Poland.
