= Pruszcz, Świecie County =

Pruszcz
- Town
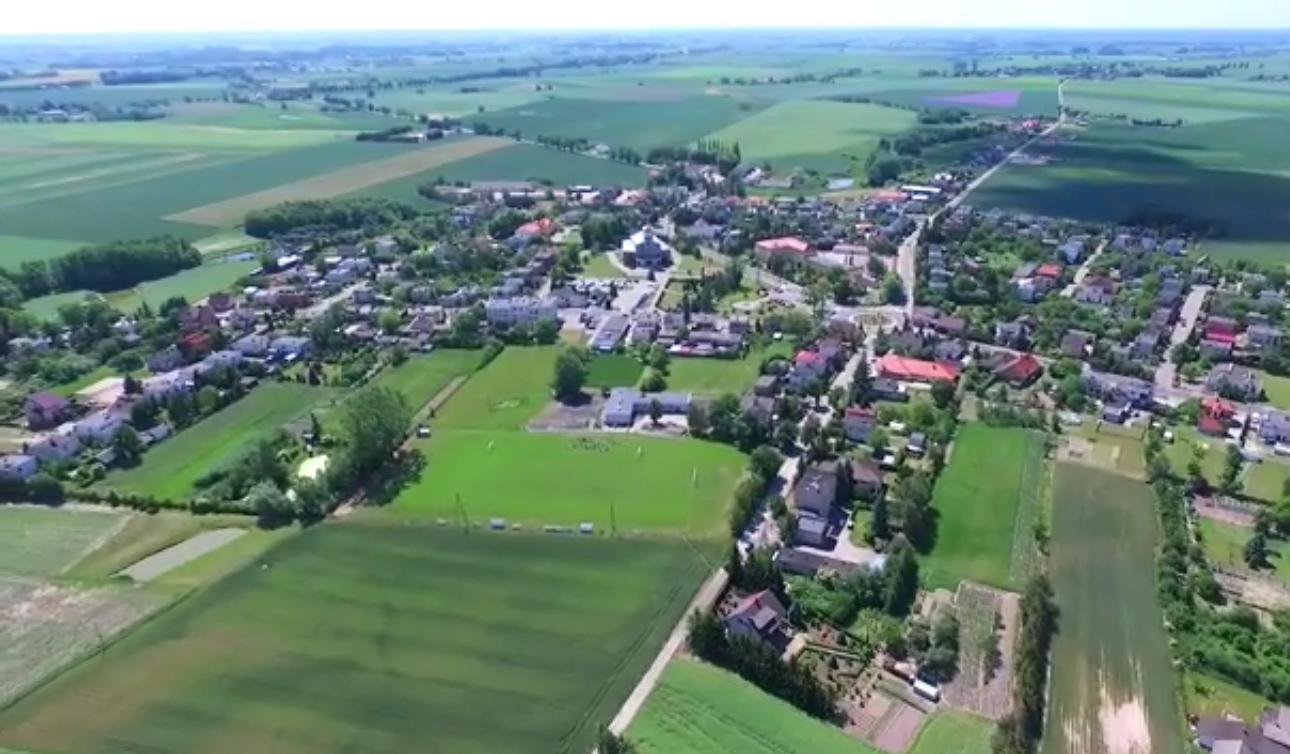
- Aerial view

- Coat of arms

- Location within Poland
- Coordinates: 53°19′46″N 18°11′55″E
- Country: Poland
- Voivodeship: Kuyavian-Pomeranian
- County: Świecie
- Gmina: Pruszcz

Population
  - Total: 2,300
- Time zone: UTC+1 (CET)
  - Summer (DST): UTC+2 (CEST)
- Vehicle registration: CSW
- Website: https://www.pruszcz.pl/

Pruszcz (Polish pronunciation: [pruʂt͡ʂ]) is a town in Świecie County, Kuyavian-Pomeranian Voivodeship, in north-central Poland. It is the seat of the gmina (administrative district) called Gmina Pruszcz.

The town has a population of 2,300.

== History ==
In 1349, Pruszcz was mentioned as a settlement on the border between the regions of Kuyavia and Pomerania. Pruszcz was a possession of Polish nobility, administratively located in the Świecie County in the Pomeranian Voivodeship of the Kingdom of Poland.

Following the joint German-Soviet invasion of Poland, which started World War II in September 1939, Pruszcz was occupied by Germany until 1945. In 1941, the occupiers carried out expulsions of Poles, who were deported to transit camps in Tczew and Smukała, Bydgoszcz, while their houses were handed over to German colonists as part of the Lebensraum policy.
