= Kisielice =

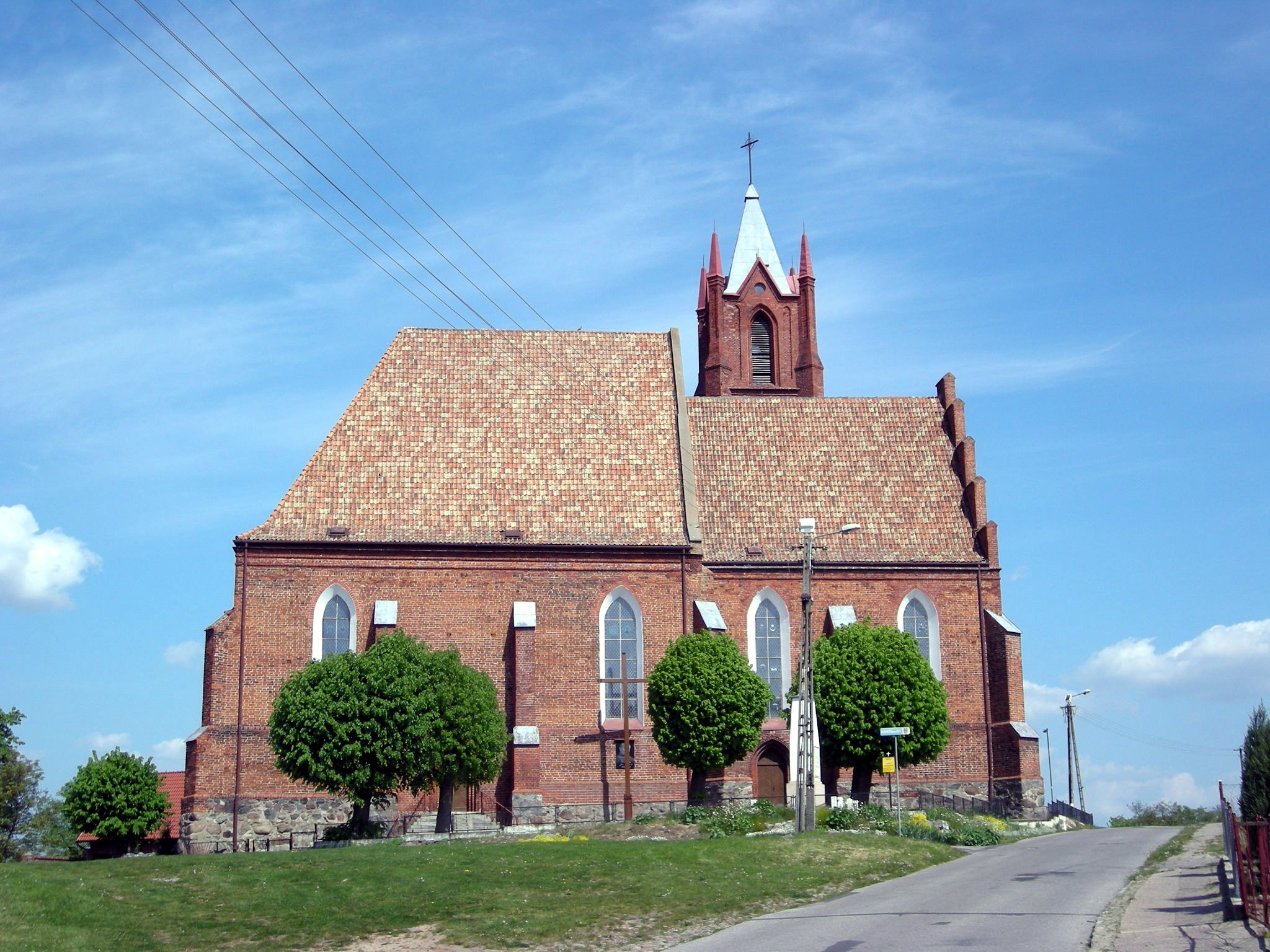
- Regina Mundi Church

- Flag Coat of arms

- Location within Poland
- Coordinates: 53°36′25″N 19°15′34″E
- Country: Poland
- Voivodeship: Warmian-Masurian
- County: Iława
- Gmina: Kisielice
- Established: 13th century
- Town rights: 1331

Area
  - Total: 3.37 km^{2} (1.30 sq mi)

Population (2017)
  - Total: 2,183
  - Density: 648/km^{2} (1,680/sq mi)
- Time zone: UTC+1 (CET)
  - Summer (DST): UTC+2 (CEST)
- Postal code: 14-220
- Vehicle registration: NIL

Kisielice [kʲiɕɛˈlʲit͡sɛ] (German: Freystadt in Westpreußen) is a town in northern Poland, seat of Gmina Kisielice in Iława County in the Warmian-Masurian Voivodeship, with 2,183 inhabitants (2017).

Kisielice is a member of Cittaslow.

== Geographical location ==
Kisielice is located on the Gardęga River on a hill in the vicinity of a small lake in the south of Dolne Powiśle region, approximately 20 km (12 mi) west of Iława, 36 km (22 mi) north-east of Grudziądz, 60 km (37 mi) south of Elbląg, 25 km (16 mi) south-east of Kwidzyn and 80 km (50 mi) south-east of the voivodeship capital of Olsztyn. In the vicinity of the town, there is a 40MW wind farm.

== History ==
The town was founded in the Old Prussian area formerly settled by the Pomesanians and conquered by the Teutonic Knights by the mid-13th century. First mentioned as Vrienstadt in a 1255 deed, the estates were ceded to the distinguished Stangen noble family by the Bishop of Pomesania in 1293. The bishop vested the settlement with Kulm law and the present-day townscape was laid out from about 1315 onwards. Already in 1331 it held town privileges, was well developed as a community, and had a priest. To the town's Polish population, it was known by the name of Kisielice. The town's parish church was built in stone during the first half of the 14th century. A town hall is mentioned in 1406; it has not been rebuilt after it burned down in 1860.

Historical population
| Year | Pop. | ±% |
|---|---|---|
| 1576 | 525 | — |
| 1782 | 719 | +37.0% |
| 1831 | 1,157 | +60.9% |
| 1875 | 2,564 | +121.6% |
| 1880 | 2,298 | −10.4% |
| 1890 | 3,075 | +33.8% |
| 1905 | 2,425 | −21.1% |
| 1933 | 3,075 | +26.8% |
| 1939 | 3,351 | +9.0% |
| 1943 | 3,313 | −1.1% |
| 2004 | 2,222 | −32.9% |

In 1397 Freystadt was repurchased by the Bishop of Pomesania. In 1454, it was incorporated to the Kingdom of Poland by King Casimir IV Jagiellon, and after the Second Peace of Toruń in 1466 it was a part of Poland as a fiefdom held by the Teutonic Order. Soon after, in 1525, in became part of the newly established Duchy of Prussia, a vassal state of Poland, under the Hohenzollern duke Albert. The town's population was largely Polish. The town's first Protestant pastor after the Reformation was Paweł Suchodolski. The inhabitants of the town mostly earned their living by professions related to agriculture, although a few craftsmen also lived in the town.

In 1773, along with territories annexed by Prussia in the First Partition of Poland, the town became part of the newly established province of West Prussia. From 1818 until 1920 Freystadt belonged to Kreis Rosenberg in the administrative district of Regierungsbezirk Marienwerder in the province of West Prussia, part of Germany from 1871. In October 1831, several Polish cavalry and infantry units and honor guards of the November Uprising stopped in the town on the way to their internment places. In 1899 the town was connected to the railway line from Riesenburg (Prabuty) to Jabłonowo.

During World War I, the Polish District People's Council (part of the Supreme People's Council) operated in the town. One of its most active members, local Polish priest Jan Mazella, was forced by the Germans to leave the town in 1920 and after the Invasion of Poland in 1939, he was murdered by the Germans in Radzim.

In 1928 about 50% of the working people were involved in trade, 20% were workmen, and 13% were civil servants, employees, pensioners and others.

After World War II, the remaining German inhabitants who had not fled before the end of war or who had returned were expelled in accordance with the Potsdam Agreement by Soviet and Soviet-installed communist authorities.

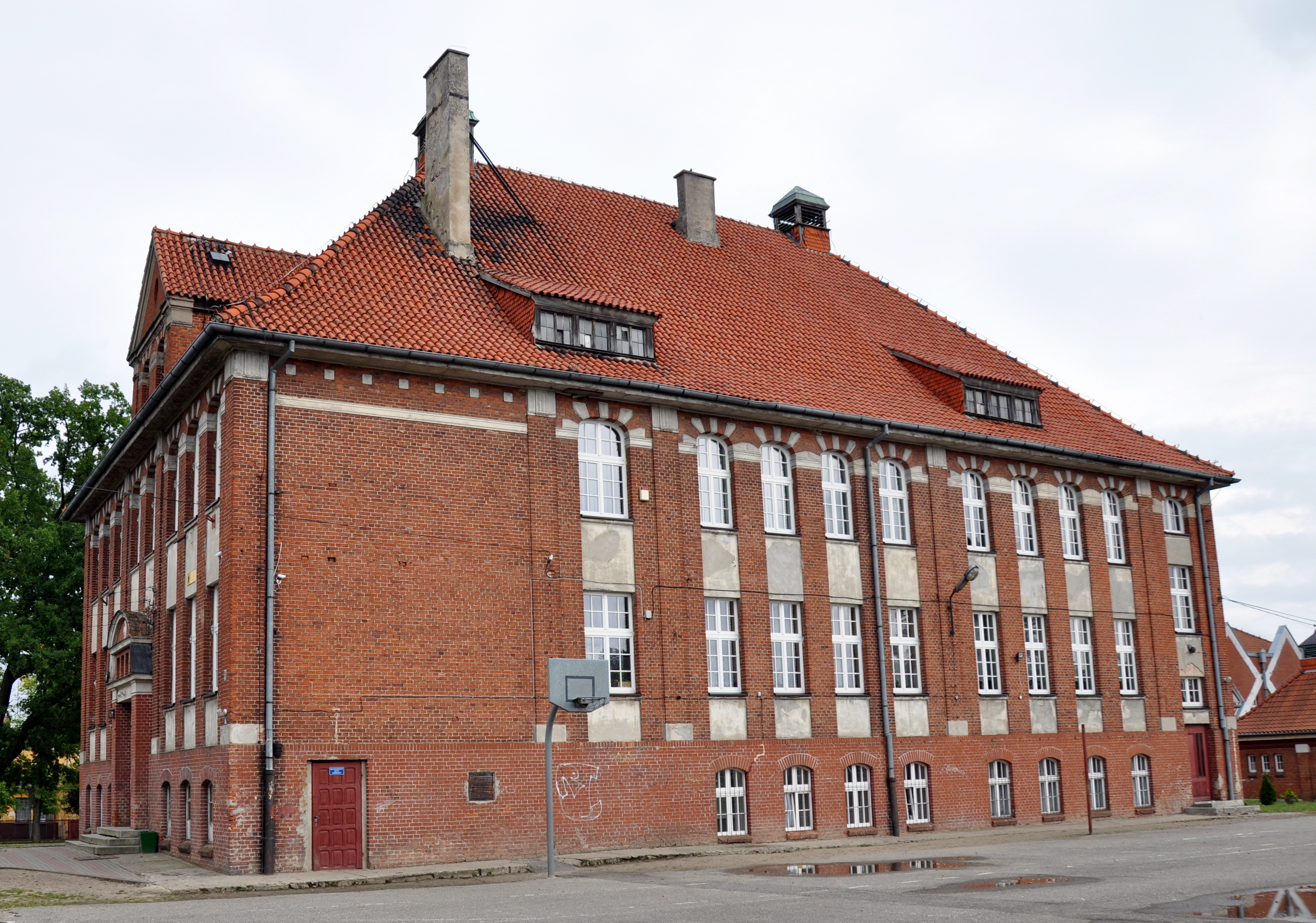
Elementary school in Kisielice

== Sports ==
The local football club is Olimpia Kisielice. It competes in the lower leagues.

== Notable residents ==
- Karl Thom (1893-1945), World War I pilot
