= Suponin =

- Village
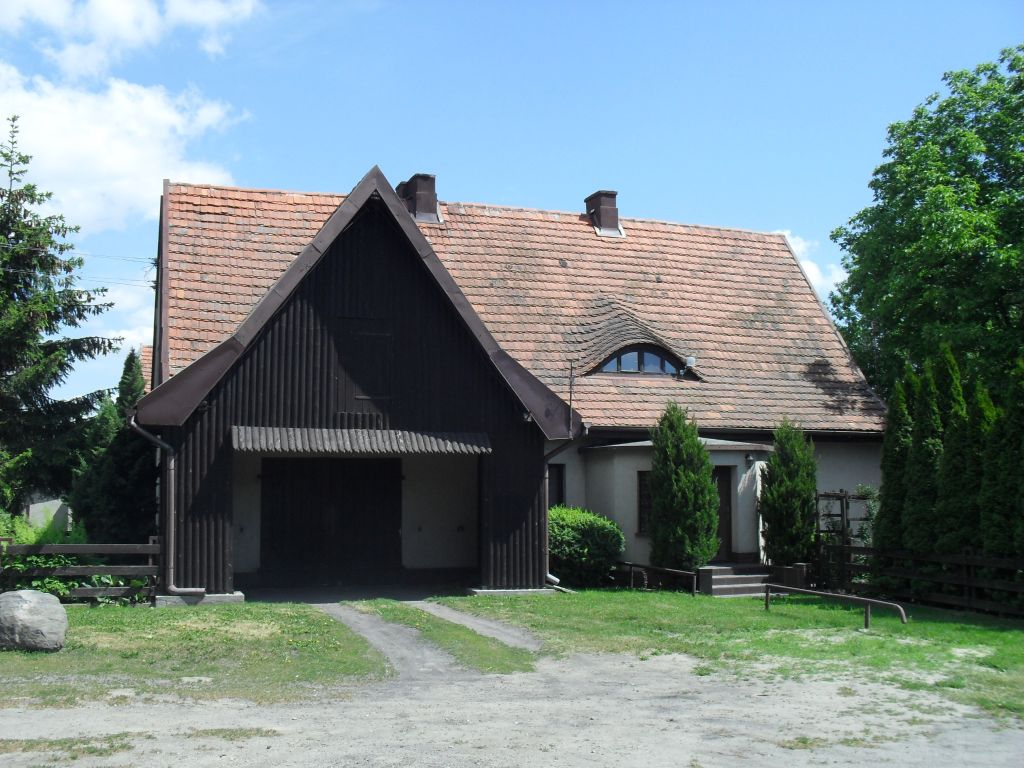

- Location within Poland
- Coordinates: 53°15′52″N 18°13′58″E
- Country: Poland
- Voivodeship: Kuyavian-Pomeranian
- County: Bydgoszcz
- Gmina: Dobrcz

Suponin [suˈpɔnin] is a village in the administrative district of Gmina Dobrcz, within Bydgoszcz County, Kuyavian-Pomeranian Voivodeship, in north-central Poland.
