= Kantowo =

- Village
- Location within Poland
- Coordinates: 53°37′07″N 19°15′05″E
- Country: Poland
- Voivodeship: Warmian-Masurian
- County: Iława
- Gmina: Kisielice

Kantowo [kanˈtɔvɔ] is a village in the administrative district of Gmina Kisielice, within Iława County, Warmian-Masurian Voivodeship, in northern Poland.
