= Marcelewo =

- Village
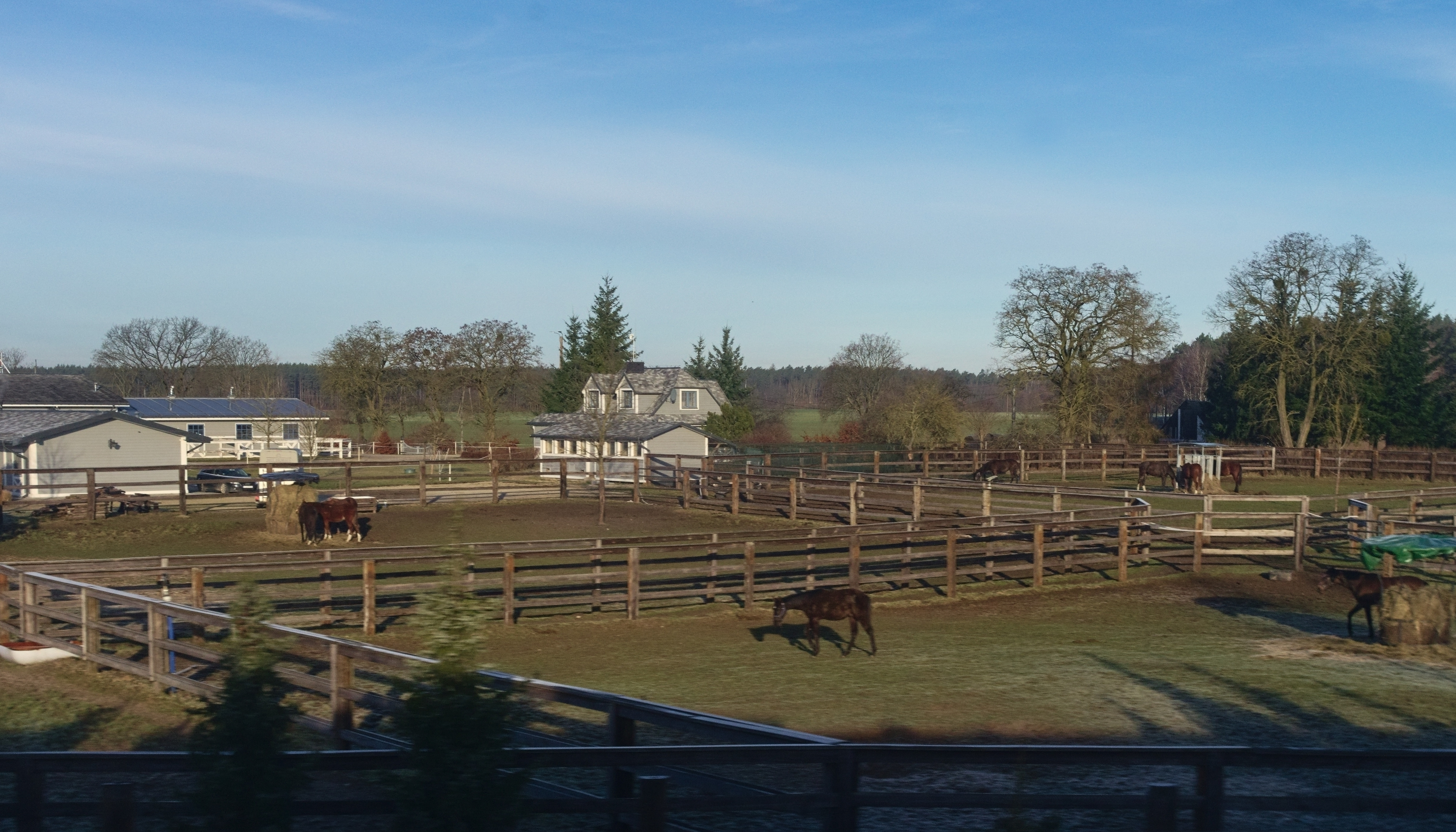
- Horse stud farm in Marcelewo (2024)

- Location within Poland
- Coordinates: 53°15′55″N 18°4′52″E
- Country: Poland
- Voivodeship: Kuyavian-Pomeranian
- County: Bydgoszcz
- Gmina: Dobrcz
- Population: 60

Marcelewo [mart͡sɛˈlɛvɔ] is a village in the administrative district of Gmina Dobrcz, within Bydgoszcz County, Kuyavian-Pomeranian Voivodeship, in north-central Poland.
