= Pyszczyn, Kuyavian-Pomeranian Voivodeship =

Pyszczyn
- Village
- Location within Poland
- Coordinates: 53°16′10″N 18°6′33″E
- Country: Poland
- Voivodeship: Kuyavian-Pomeranian
- County: Bydgoszcz
- Gmina: Dobrcz
- Population: 160

Pyszczyn [ˈpɨʂt͡ʂɨn] is a village in the administrative district of Gmina Dobrcz, within Bydgoszcz County, Kuyavian-Pomeranian Voivodeship, in north-central Poland.
