= Trzebień, Kuyavian-Pomeranian Voivodeship =

Trzebień
- Village
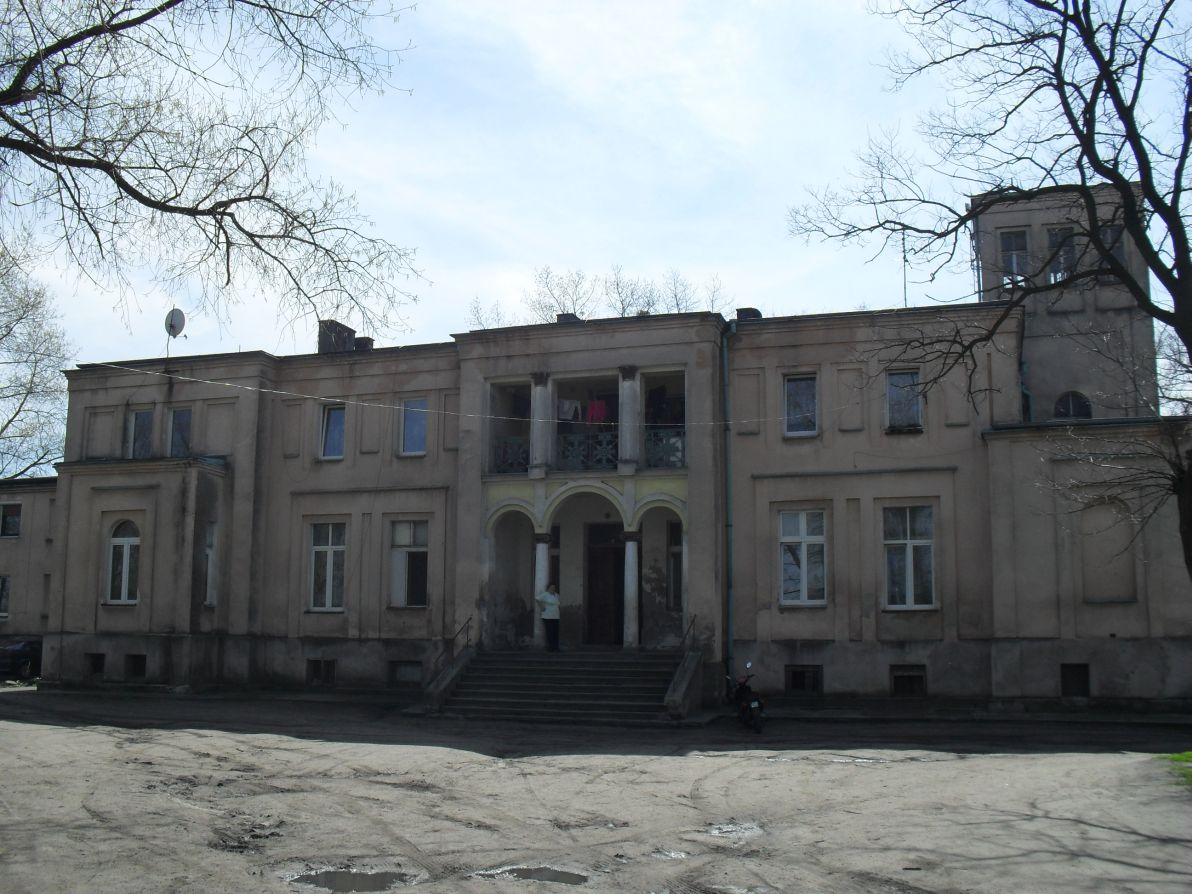

- Location within Poland
- Coordinates: 53°17′42″N 18°08′30″E
- Country: Poland
- Voivodeship: Kuyavian-Pomeranian
- County: Bydgoszcz
- Gmina: Dobrcz

Trzebień [ˈtʂɛbjɛɲ] is a village in the administrative district of Gmina Dobrcz, within Bydgoszcz County, Kuyavian-Pomeranian Voivodeship, in north-central Poland.
