= Grabowo, Kuyavian-Pomeranian Voivodeship =

Human settlement in Pomerania

Grabowo
- Hamlet
- Location within Poland
- Coordinates: 53°15′30″N 18°16′26″E
- Country: Poland
- Voivodeship: Kuyavian-Pomeranian
- County: Świecie
- Gmina: Pruszcz
- Population: 60

Grabowo [ɡraˈbɔvɔ] is a hamlet in the administrative district of Gmina Pruszcz, within Świecie County, Kuyavian-Pomeranian Voivodeship, in north-central Poland.
