= Sienno, Kuyavian-Pomeranian Voivodeship =

Sienno
- Village
- Location within Poland
- Coordinates: 53°18′N 18°10′E
- Country: Poland
- Voivodeship: Kuyavian-Pomeranian
- County: Bydgoszcz
- Gmina: Dobrcz

Sienno [ˈɕɛnnɔ] is a village in the administrative district of Gmina Dobrcz, within Bydgoszcz County, Kuyavian-Pomeranian Voivodeship, in north-central Poland.
