= Łęgowo, Iława County =

Łęgowo
- Village
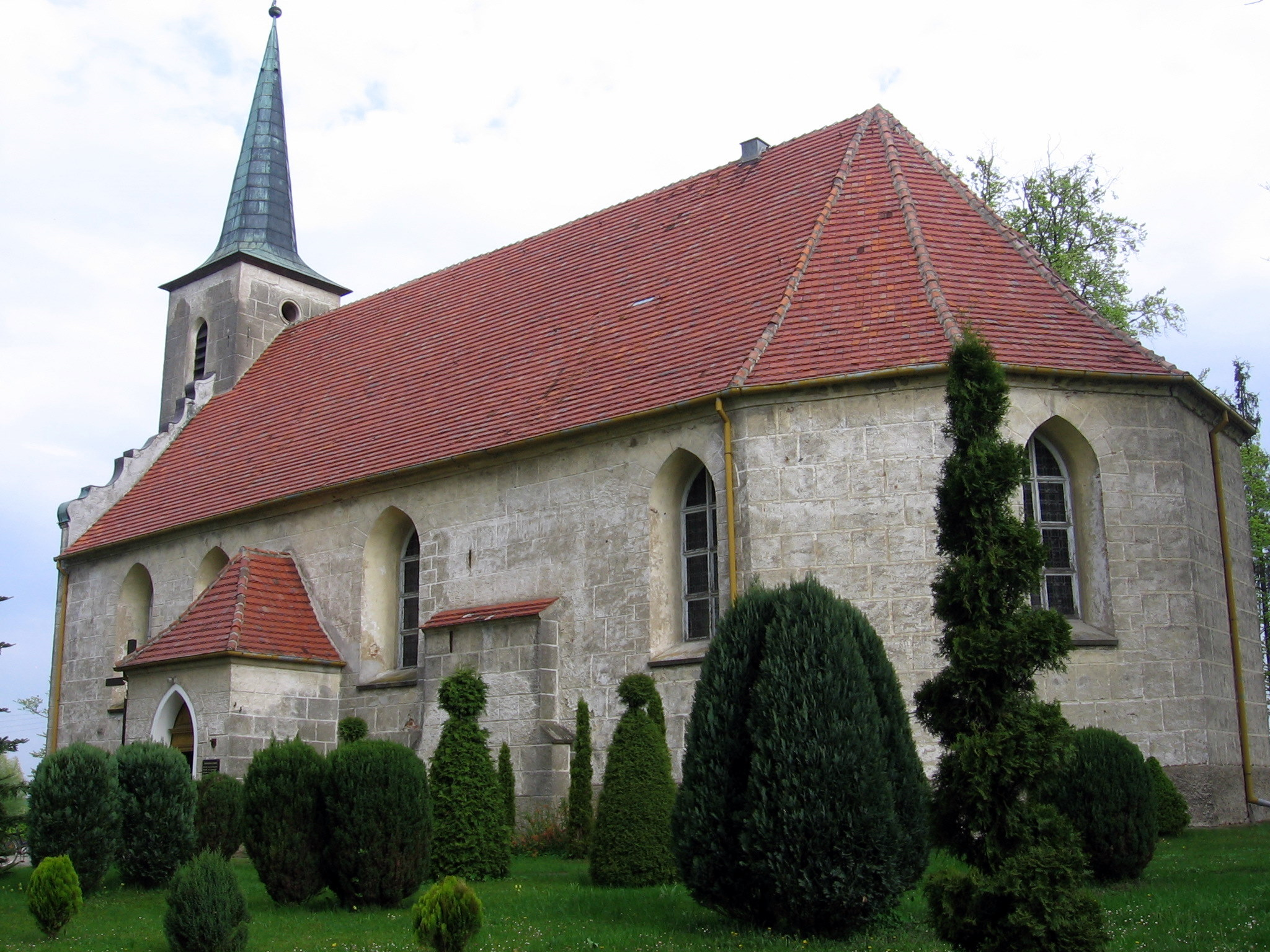
- Immaculate Conception church in Łęgowo

- Location within Poland
- Coordinates: 53°38′N 19°19′E
- Country: Poland
- Voivodeship: Warmian-Masurian
- County: Iława
- Gmina: Kisielice
- Population: 690
- Time zone: UTC+1 (CET)
  - Summer (DST): UTC+2 (CEST)
- Vehicle registration: NIL

Łęgowo [wɛnˈɡɔvɔ] is a village in the administrative district of Gmina Kisielice, within Iława County, Warmian-Masurian Voivodeship, in northern Poland.

== History ==
The village was first settled by Polish people, and its name is of Polish origin. It was devastated during the Thirteen Years' War (1454–1466).
