= Gołuszyce =

- Village
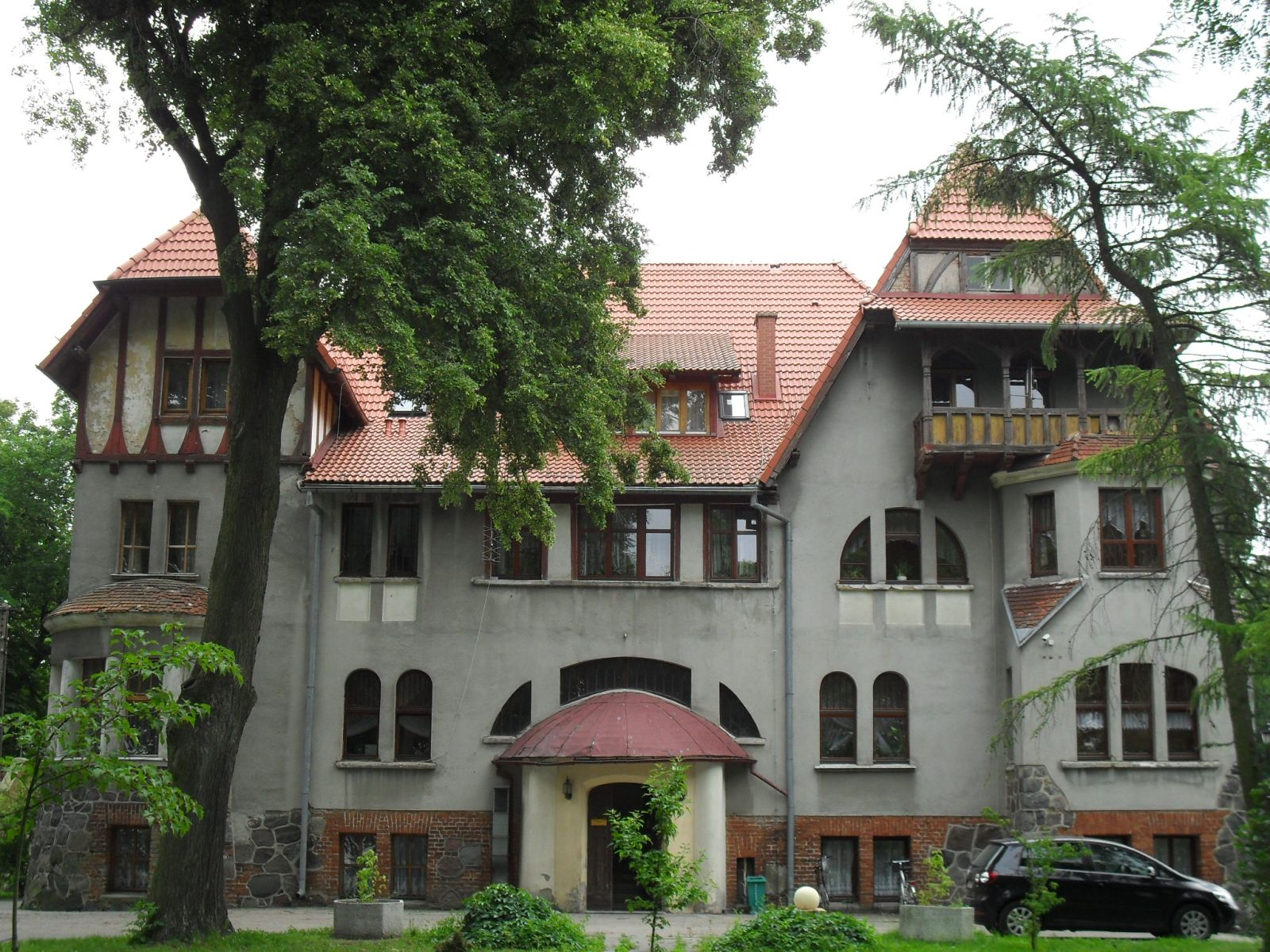
- Social Welfare Centre

- Location within Poland
- Coordinates: 53°22′N 18°13′E
- Country: Poland
- Voivodeship: Kuyavian-Pomeranian
- County: Świecie
- Gmina: Pruszcz
- Elevation: 99.8 m (327 ft)

Population (approx.)
  - Total: 500
- Time zone: UTC+1 (CET)
  - Summer (DST): UTC+2 (CEST)
- Vehicle registration: CSW

Gołuszyce [ɡɔwuˈʂɨt͡sɛ] is a village in the administrative district of Gmina Pruszcz, within Świecie County, Kuyavian-Pomeranian Voivodeship, in north-central Poland.

The village has an approximate population of 500.

== History ==
Gołuszyce is an old settlement, and a cemetery predating Christianity in Poland was discovered there. Gołuszyce was a private village of Polish nobility, including the Łąszewski family of Grzymała coat of arms, administratively located in the Świecie County in the Pomeranian Voivodeship of the Kingdom of Poland.

Following the joint German-Soviet invasion of Poland, which started World War II in September 1939, the village was occupied by Germany until 1945. In October 1941, the occupiers carried out expulsions of Poles, who were deported to a transit camp in Smukała, Bydgoszcz, while their houses were handed over to German colonists as part of the Lebensraum policy.
