= Jędrychowo, Iława County =

Jędrychowo
- Village
- Location within Poland
- Coordinates: 53°36′N 19°22′E
- Country: Poland
- Voivodeship: Warmian-Masurian
- County: Iława
- Gmina: Kisielice

Jędrychowo [jɛndrɨˈxɔvɔ] is a village in the administrative district of Gmina Kisielice, within Iława County, Warmian-Masurian Voivodeship, in northern Poland.
