= Łodygowo, Iława County =

Łodygowo
- Village
- Location within Poland
- Coordinates: 53°37′N 19°11′E
- Country: Poland
- Voivodeship: Warmian-Masurian
- County: Iława
- Gmina: Kisielice

Łodygowo [wɔdɨˈɡɔvɔ] is a village in the administrative district of Gmina Kisielice, within Iława County, Warmian-Masurian Voivodeship, in northern Poland.
