= Gmina Dobrcz =

Gmina Dobrcz Dobrcz Commune
- Gmina
- Coat of arms

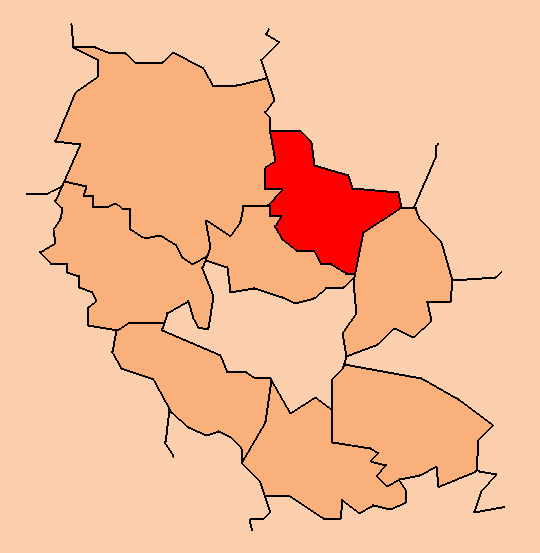
- Location within the county
- Coordinates (Dobrcz): 53°16′N 18°9′E
- Country: Poland
- Voivodeship: Kuyavian-Pomeranian
- County: Bydgoszcz County
- Seat: Dobrcz

Area
  - Total: 130.41 km^{2} (50.35 sq mi)

Population (2006)
  - Total: 9,215
  - Density: 70.66/km^{2} (183.0/sq mi)
- Website: https://gminadobrcz.pl/

Gmina Dobrcz is a rural gmina (administrative district) in Bydgoszcz County, Kuyavian-Pomeranian Voivodeship, in north-central Poland. Its seat is the village of Dobrcz, which lies approximately 20 kilometres (12 mi) north-east of Bydgoszcz.

The gmina covers an area of 130.41 square kilometres (50.4 sq mi), and as of 2006 its total population is 9,215. It contains 21 sołectwos. The area is mainly agricultural, although the gmina also has about 1,000 hectares of forest.

== History ==
The first records of Dobrcz date from 1213 when the bishop of Kraków, Iwan Odrowąż, handed over his family estate to the Cistercian monastery in Sulejów. Later on, Dobrcz became the property of the Cistercian order in Byszewo. The area of the commune and the vicinity of Strzelce Dolne can be associated with the Dutch settlement of the mid-16th century. It contributed to the development of technical knowledge with respect to melioration and recovery of wet cropland.

During the Prussian annexation, Dobrcz and its vicinity became the place where the policy of Germanisation was implemented. Due to this fact, the most affluent regions in Włóki and Borówno passed to Germans. After Poland regained its independence, Dobrcz was incorporated into the rural commune Bydgoszcz II in 1928 and in 1933 Dobrcz commune was established. The remnants of Hitler's occupation and terror are places sanctified with Polish blood such as the cemetery in Borówno, where approximately one thousand victims are buried. The monument of Heroes, erected in Włóki in 1947, is a tribute to Polish soldiers killed in 1939 and buried here in a collective grave.

== Historic buildings ==
Gmina Dobrcz has several historic buildings:

- The Church of St. Wawrzyniec, built in the mid 19th century and rebuilt after the fire at the end of the 19th century.
- In Włóki, St. Mary Magdalen's Church, built of wood towards the end of the 17th century.
- Mansion in Gąecz from the mid 19th century with a horse-chestnut avenue presently housing the State House of Social Welfare for Adults.
- Mansion in Trzęsacz with a landscape park, picturesque view on a steep slope descending towards the Vistula.
- Manor in Kotomierz built after 1850 with a new wing annexed towards the end of the 19th century, situated in a park next to farm buildings.
- 19th-century mansion complex with a brick mansion building in Strzelce Górne, now housing a primary school.

== Natural amenities ==
The roads leading through the area of commune include the road from Bydgoszcz to Świecie, the road between Kotomierz and Sienno with over 270 trees including 260 oaks, the road near Strzelce Dolne with a view over the extensive preglacial valley of the Vistula.

The Borówno Lake is a popular local attraction, with an easily accessible season camp in the summer. There are also many recreational garden plots in Nekla.

Two tourist routes lead through the Lower Vistula valley (52 km), via Strzelce Górne, Gądecz, Chełmszczonka, Trzęsacz, Zła Wieś and Kozielec. The other is the route of along the Koronowo lakes.

== Villages ==
Gmina Dobrcz contains the villages and settlements of Aleksandrowiec, Aleksandrowo, Augustowo, Borówno, Chełmszczonka, Dobrcz, Gądecz, Hutna Wieś, Karczemka, Karolewo, Kotomierz, Kozielec, Kusowo, Linówiec, Magdalenka, Marcelewo, Nekla, Pauliny, Pyszczyn, Sienno, Stronno, Strzelce Dolne, Strzelce Górne, Suponin, Trzebień, Trzeciewiec, Trzęsacz, Włóki, Wudzyn, Wudzynek, Zalesie and Zła Wieś.

== Neighbouring gminas ==
Gmina Dobrcz is bordered by the city of Bydgoszcz and by the gminas of Dąbrowa Chełmińska, Koronowo, Osielsko and Pruszcz.
