= Stary Folwark, Warmian-Masurian Voivodeship =

Stary Folwark
- Village
- Location within Poland
- Coordinates: 53°37′39″N 19°19′41″E
- Country: Poland
- Voivodeship: Warmian-Masurian
- County: Iława
- Gmina: Kisielice

Stary Folwark [ˈstarɨ ˈfɔlvark] is a village in the administrative district of Gmina Kisielice, within Iława County, Warmian-Masurian Voivodeship, in northern Poland.
