= Zalesie, Bydgoszcz County =

Zalesie
- Village
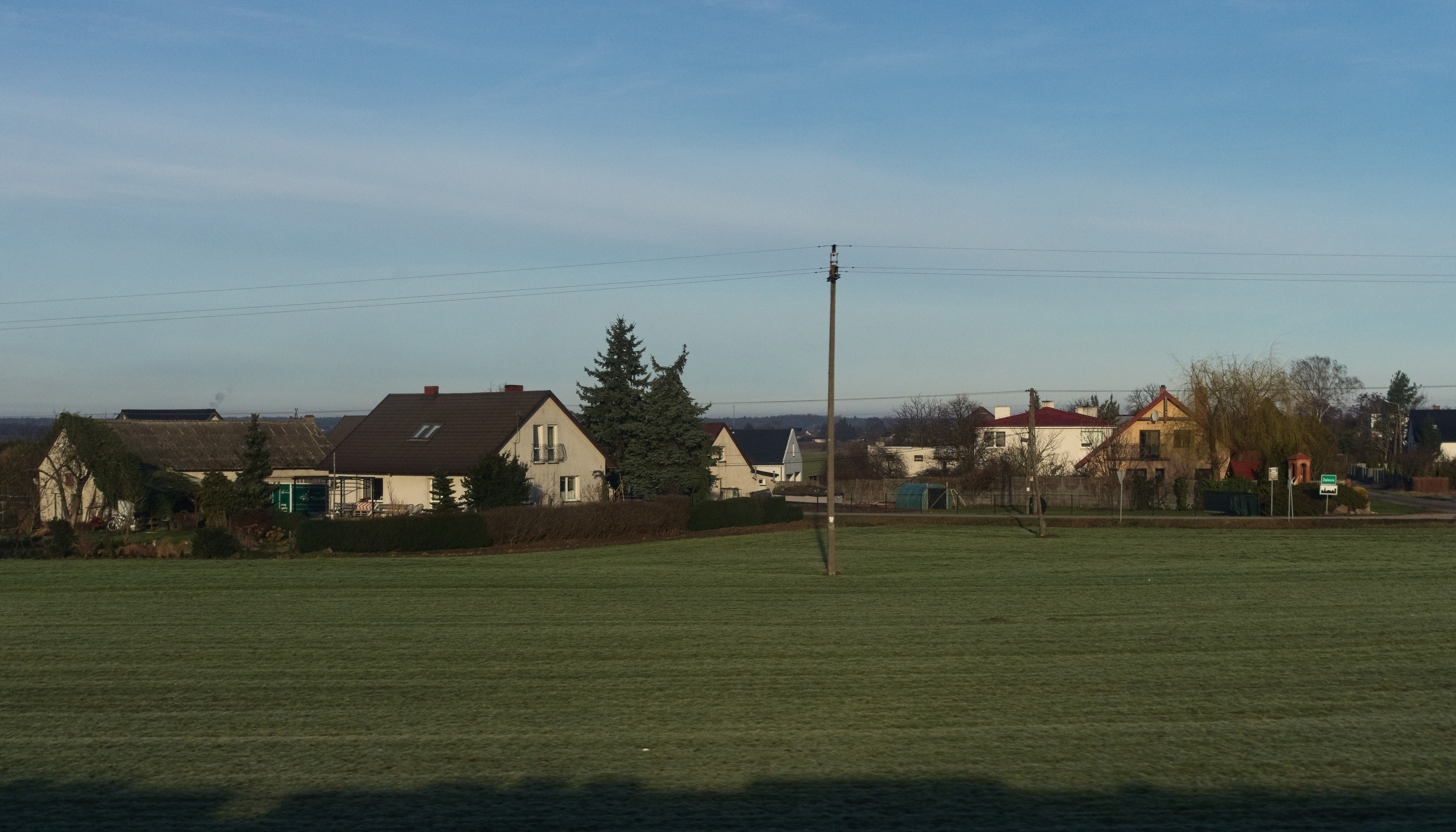

- Location within Poland
- Coordinates: 53°16′30″N 18°5′51″E
- Country: Poland
- Voivodeship: Kuyavian-Pomeranian
- County: Bydgoszcz
- Gmina: Dobrcz

Zalesie [zaˈlɛɕɛ] is a village in the administrative district of Gmina Dobrcz, within Bydgoszcz County, Kuyavian-Pomeranian Voivodeship, in north-central Poland.
