= Niewieścin =

- Village
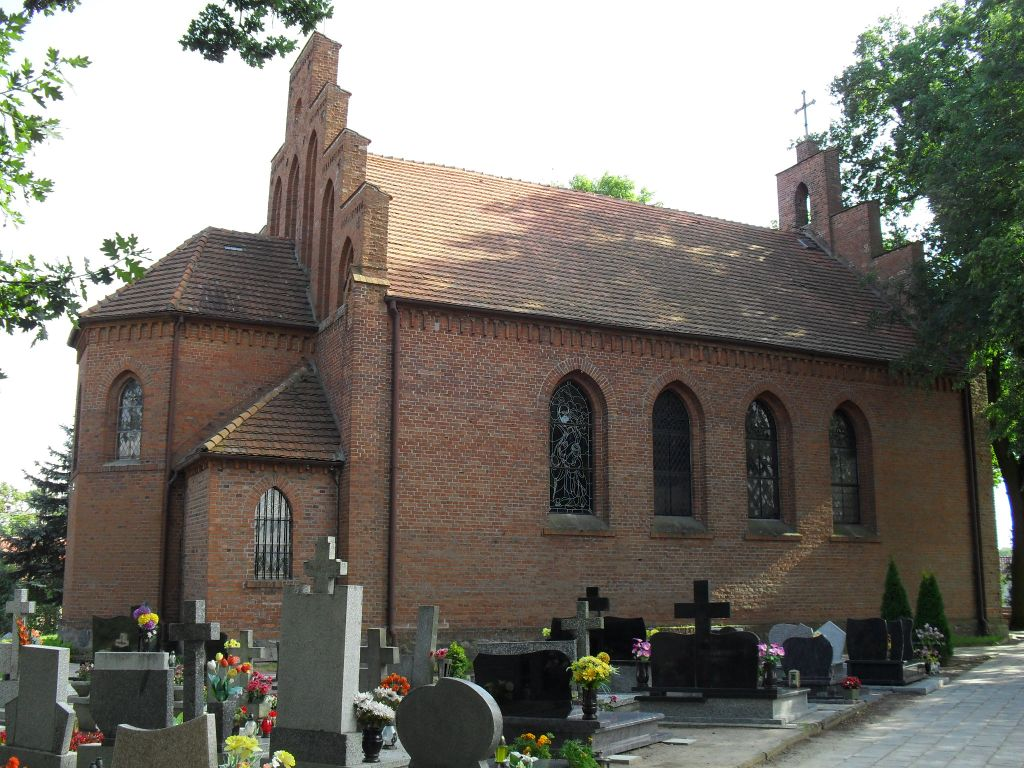
- Saint James the Greater church in Niewieścin

- Location within Poland
- Coordinates: 53°17′32″N 18°13′24″E
- Country: Poland
- Voivodeship: Kuyavian-Pomeranian
- County: Świecie
- Gmina: Pruszcz

Population
  - Total: 495 (2,011)
- Time zone: UTC+1 (CET)
  - Summer (DST): UTC+2 (CEST)
- Vehicle registration: CSW

Niewieścin [ɲɛˈvjɛɕt͡ɕin] is a village in the administrative district of Gmina Pruszcz, within Świecie County, Kuyavian-Pomeranian Voivodeship, in north-central Poland. It is situated on the northern shore of Niewieścińskie Lake.

== History ==
Niewieścin was a private village of Polish nobility, administratively located in the Świecie County in the Pomeranian Voivodeship of the Kingdom of Poland.

Following the joint German-Soviet invasion of Poland, which started World War II in September 1939, the village was occupied by Germany until 1945. In October 1941, the occupiers carried out expulsions of Poles, who were deported to a transit camp in Smukała, Bydgoszcz, while their houses were handed over to German colonists as part of the Lebensraum policy.
