= Linówiec =

- Village
- Location within Poland
- Coordinates: 53°15′01″N 18°06′28″E
- Country: Poland
- Voivodeship: Kuyavian-Pomeranian
- County: Bydgoszcz
- Gmina: Dobrcz

Linówiec [liˈnuvjɛt͡s] is a village in the administrative district of Gmina Dobrcz, within Bydgoszcz County, Kuyavian-Pomeranian Voivodeship, in north-central Poland.
