= Kusowo, Kuyavian-Pomeranian Voivodeship =

Kusowo
- Village
- Location within Poland
- Coordinates: 53°14′19″N 18°9′24″E
- Country: Poland
- Voivodeship: Kuyavian-Pomeranian
- County: Bydgoszcz
- Gmina: Dobrcz
- Population: 541

Kusowo [kuˈsɔvɔ] is a village in the administrative district of Gmina Dobrcz, within Bydgoszcz County, Kuyavian-Pomeranian Voivodeship, in north-central Poland.
