= Wałdowo, Świecie County =

Wałdowo
- Village
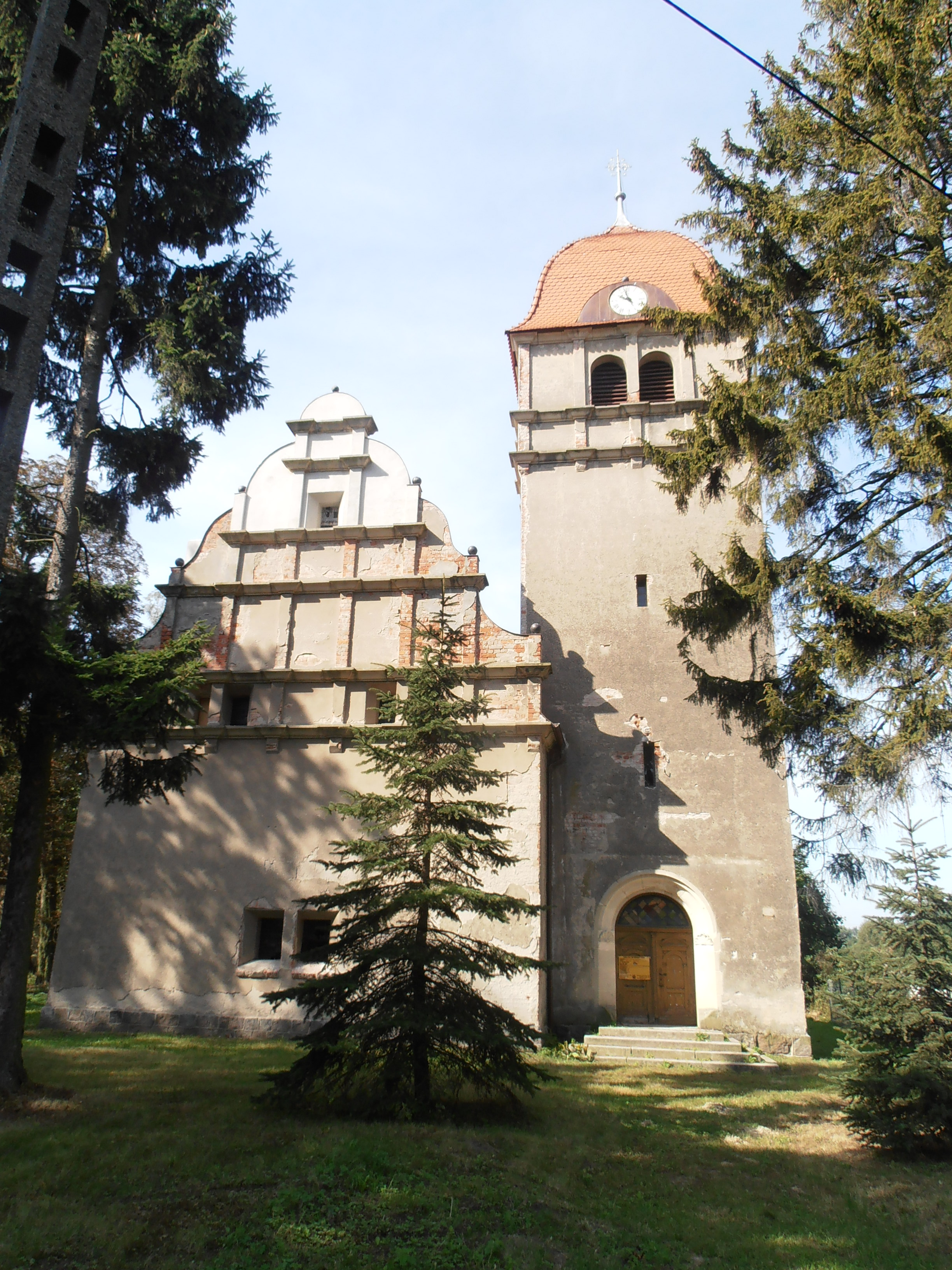
- Exaltation of the Holy Cross church in Wałdowo

- Location within Poland
- Coordinates: 53°20′N 18°14′E
- Country: Poland
- Voivodeship: Kuyavian-Pomeranian
- County: Świecie
- Gmina: Pruszcz
- Vehicle registration: CSW

Wałdowo [vau̯ˈdɔvɔ] is a village in the administrative district of Gmina Pruszcz, within Świecie County, Kuyavian-Pomeranian Voivodeship, in north-central Poland.

== History ==
Wałdowo was a private village of Polish nobility, including the Wałdowski family, administratively located in the Świecie County in the Pomeranian Voivodeship of the Kingdom of Poland.

Following the joint German-Soviet invasion of Poland, which started World War II in September 1939, the village was occupied by Germany until 1945. In February 1941, the occupiers carried out expulsions of Poles, who were deported to a transit camp in Tczew, while their houses were handed over to German colonists as part of the Lebensraum policy.
