= Dobrcz =

- Village
- Location within Poland
- Coordinates: 53°16′N 18°9′E
- Country: Poland
- Voivodeship: Kuyavian-Pomeranian
- County: Bydgoszcz
- Gmina: Dobrcz

Dobrcz [dɔbrt͡ʂ] is a village in Bydgoszcz County, Kuyavian-Pomeranian Voivodeship, in north-central Poland. It is the seat of the gmina (administrative district) called Gmina Dobrcz.
