= Karczemka, Bydgoszcz County =

Karczemka
- Village
- Location within Poland
- Coordinates: 53°16′35″N 18°5′23″E
- Country: Poland
- Voivodeship: Kuyavian-Pomeranian
- County: Bydgoszcz
- Gmina: Dobrcz
- Population: 70

Karczemka [karˈt͡ʂɛmka] is a village in the administrative district of Gmina Dobrcz, within Bydgoszcz County, Kuyavian-Pomeranian Voivodeship, in north-central Poland.
