= Bagniewo, Kuyavian-Pomeranian Voivodeship =

Village in Kuyavian-Pomeranian Voivodeship, Poland

Bagniewo
- Village
- Location within Poland
- Coordinates: 53°21′26″N 18°15′2″E
- Country: Poland
- Voivodeship: Kuyavian-Pomeranian
- County: Świecie
- Gmina: Pruszcz
- Time zone: UTC+1 (CET)
  - Summer (DST): UTC+2 (CEST)
- Vehicle registration: CSW

Bagniewo [baɡˈɲɛvɔ] is a village in the administrative district of Gmina Pruszcz, within Świecie County, Kuyavian-Pomeranian Voivodeship, in north-central Poland. It is located within the ethnocultural region of Kociewie in the historic region of Pomerania.

== History ==
Bagniewo was a private village of Polish nobility, including the Bagniewski family of Bawola Głowa coat of arms, administratively located in the Świecie County in the Pomeranian Voivodeship of the Kingdom of Poland.

Following the joint German-Soviet invasion of Poland, which started World War II in September 1939, the village was occupied by Germany until 1945. In October 1941, the occupiers carried out expulsions of Poles, who were deported to a transit camp in Smukała, Bydgoszcz, while their houses were handed over to German colonists as part of the Lebensraum policy.
