= Fordon Slope =

Microregion in northern Poland

Coordinates: 53°08′51.47″N 18°10′03.98″E

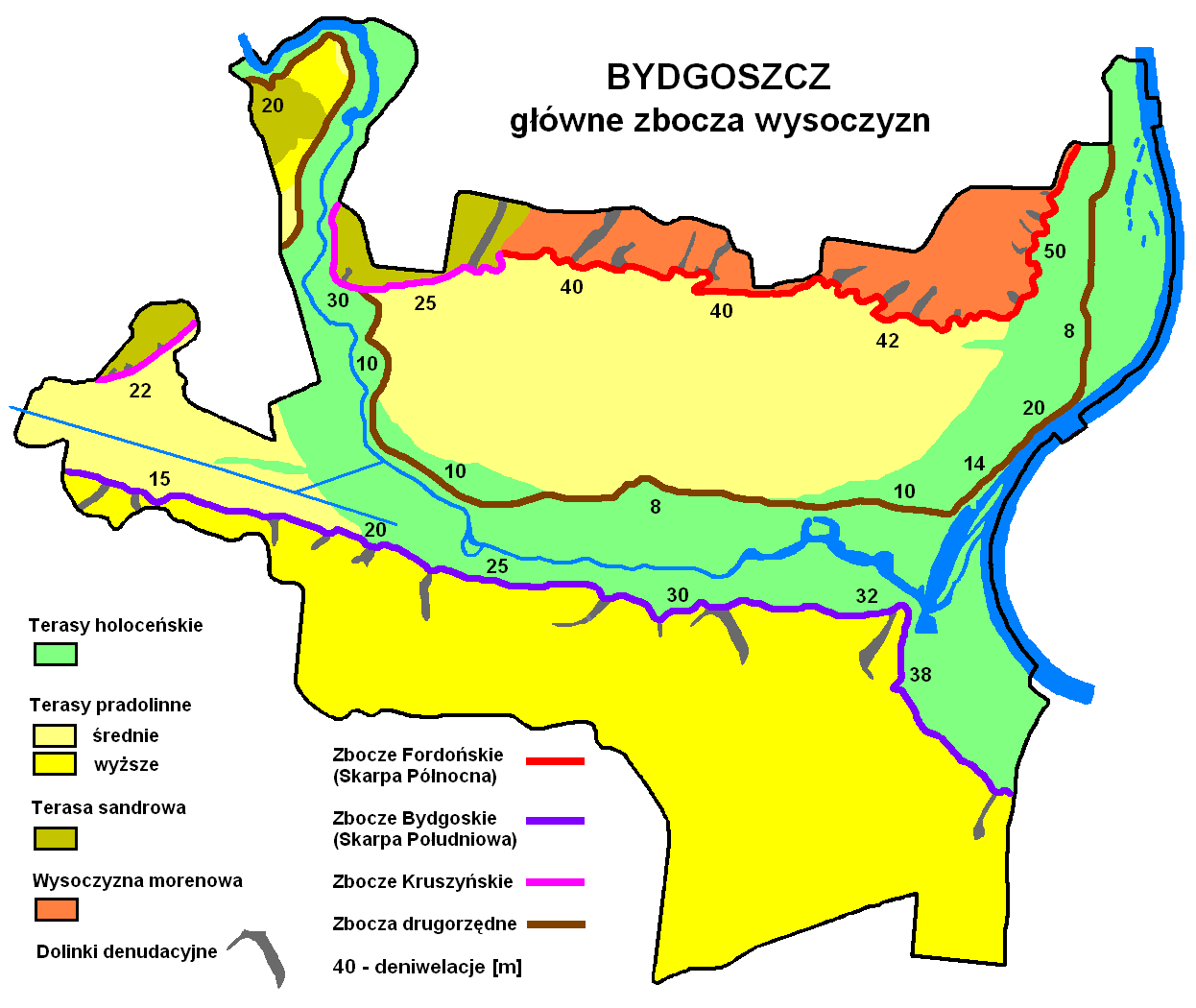
Diagram of the Fordon Slope

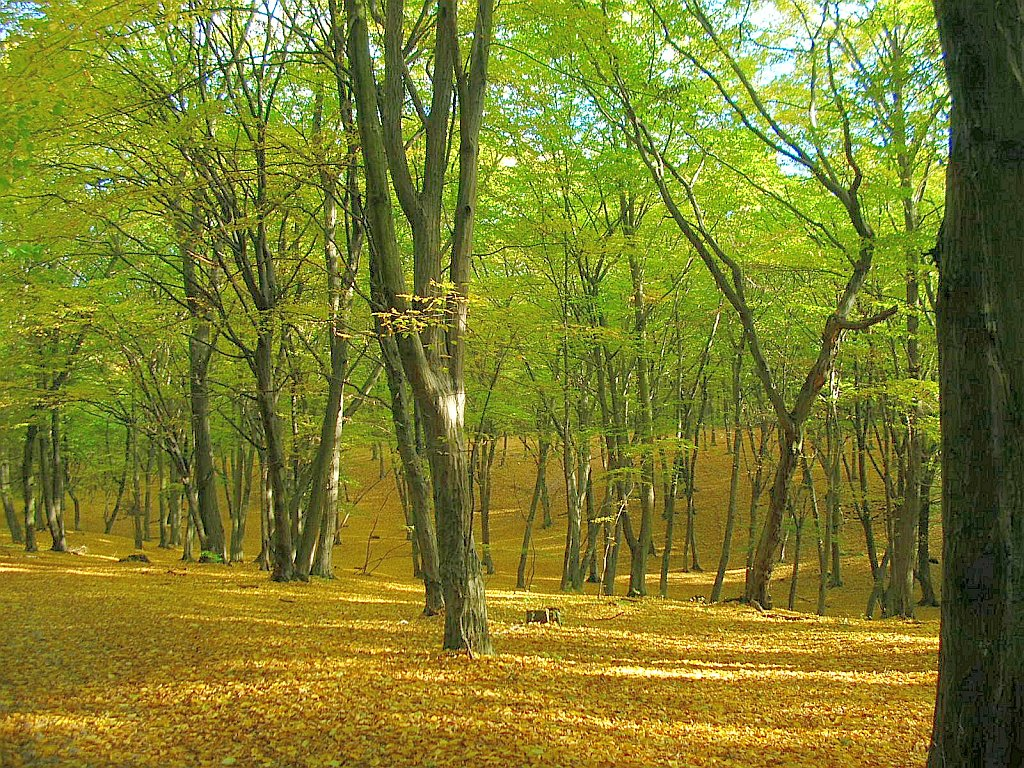
Oak-hornbeam forest in Forest Park of Culture and Recreation

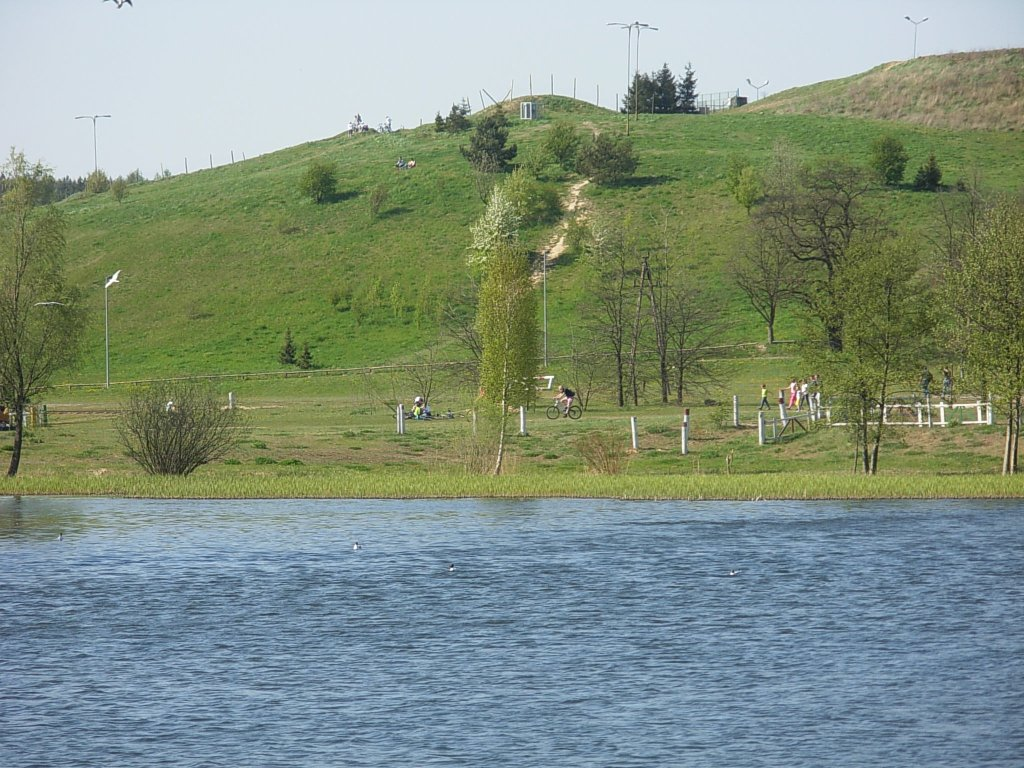
Myślęcinek Hill

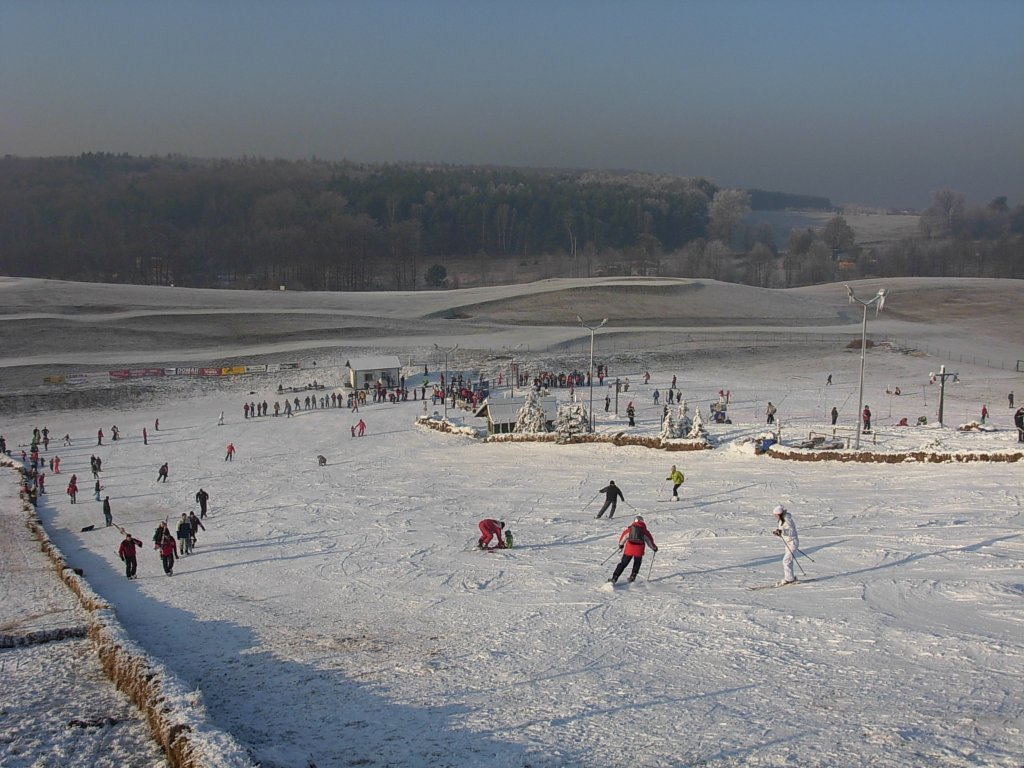
Ski slope on a hill in Myślęcinek

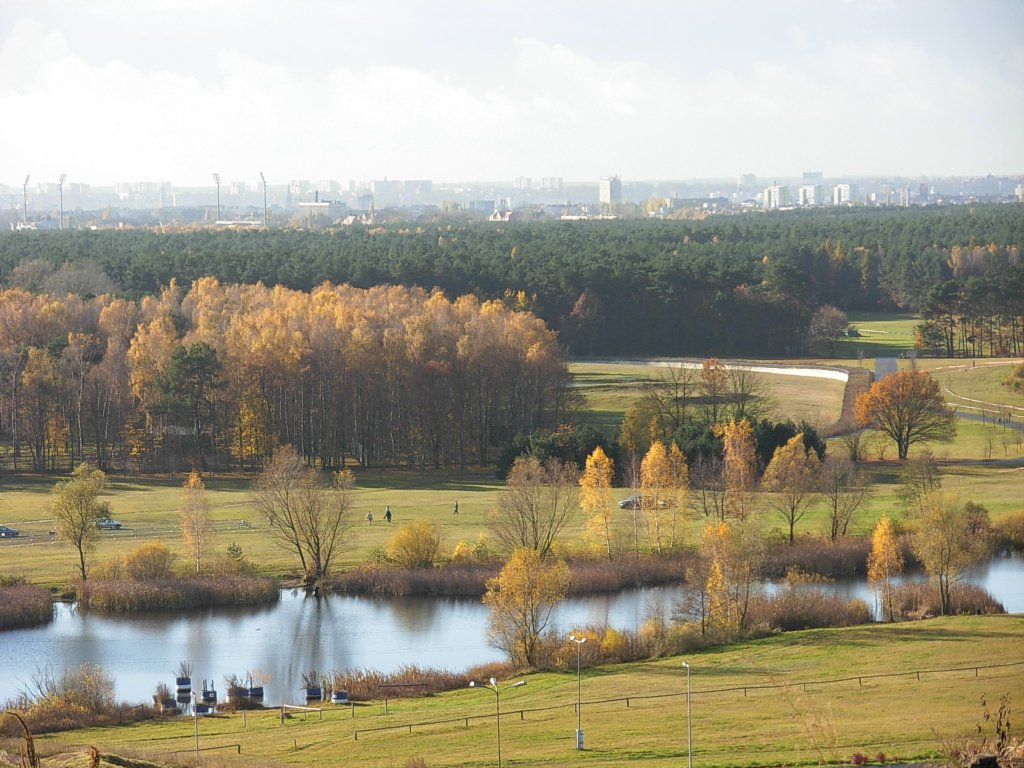
View from Myślęcinek Hill

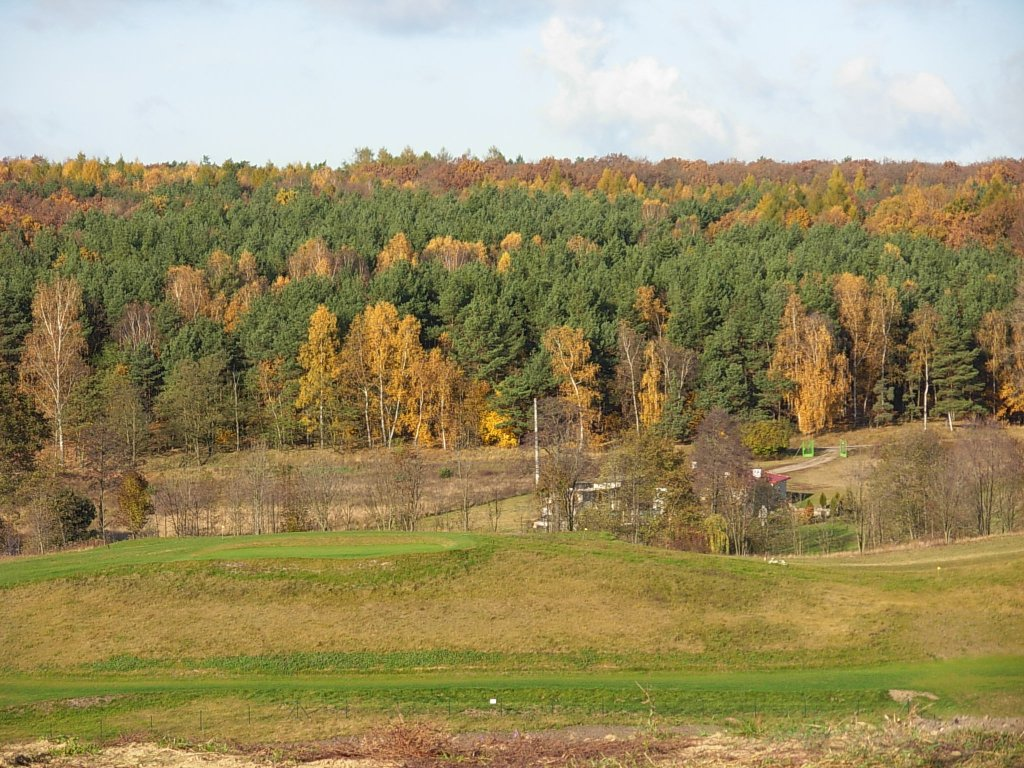
Slope of a small valley in Myślęcinek

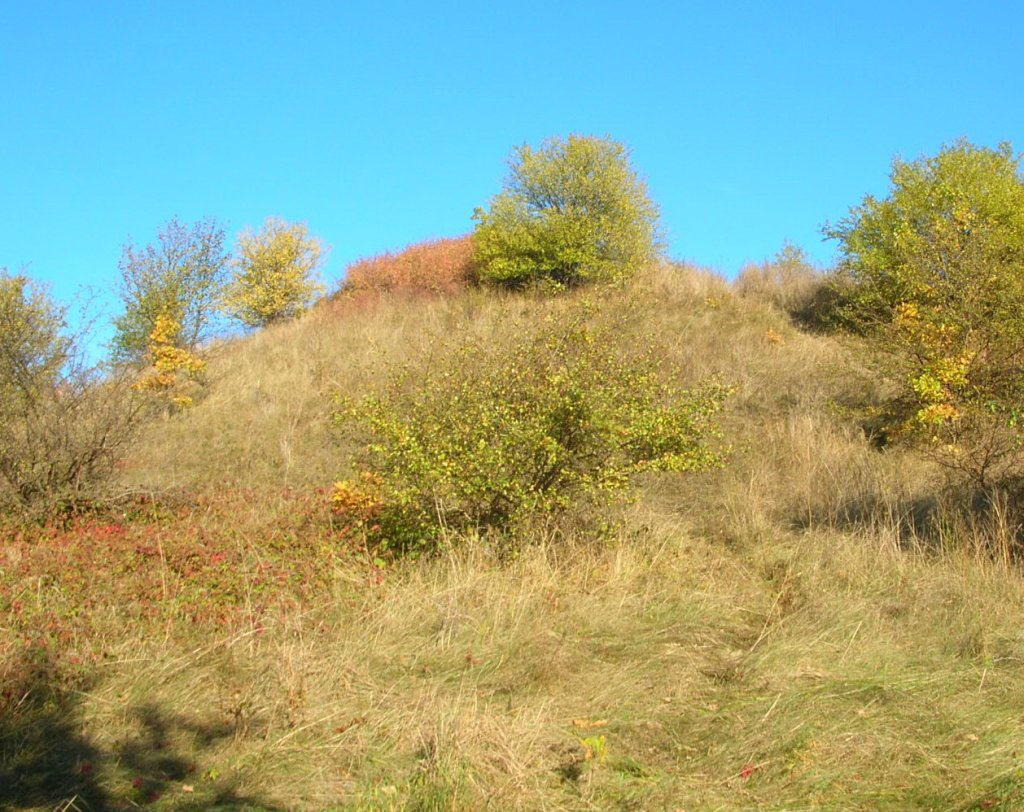
Zamczysko hillfort

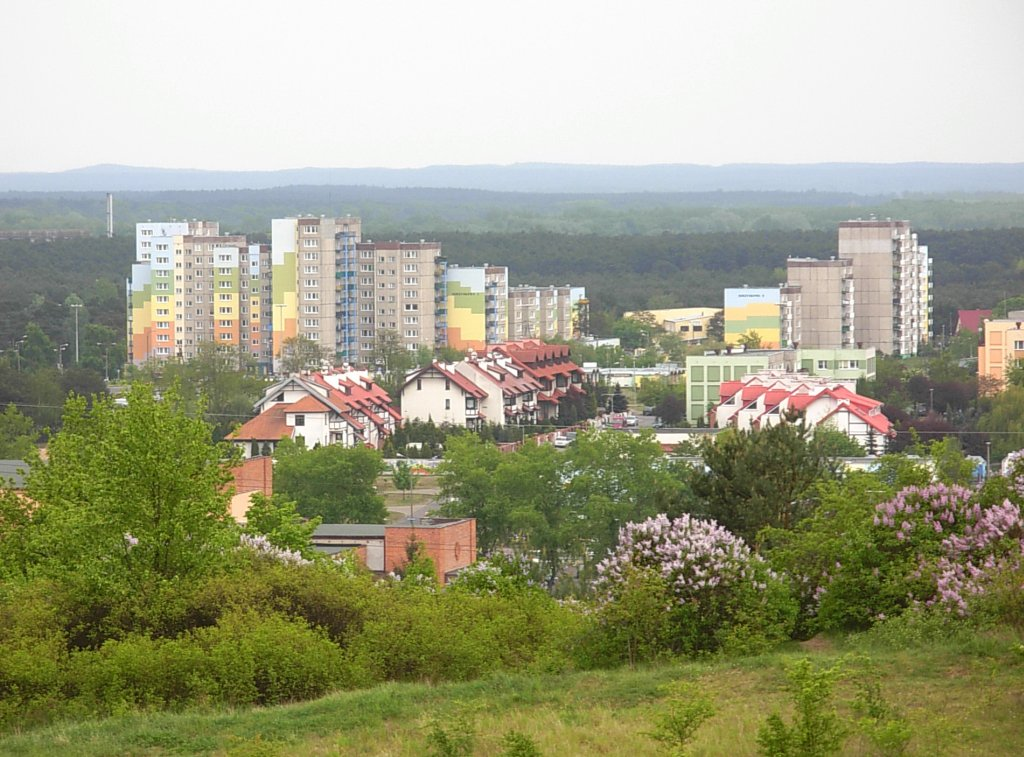
View of Bohaterów Estate in Fordon

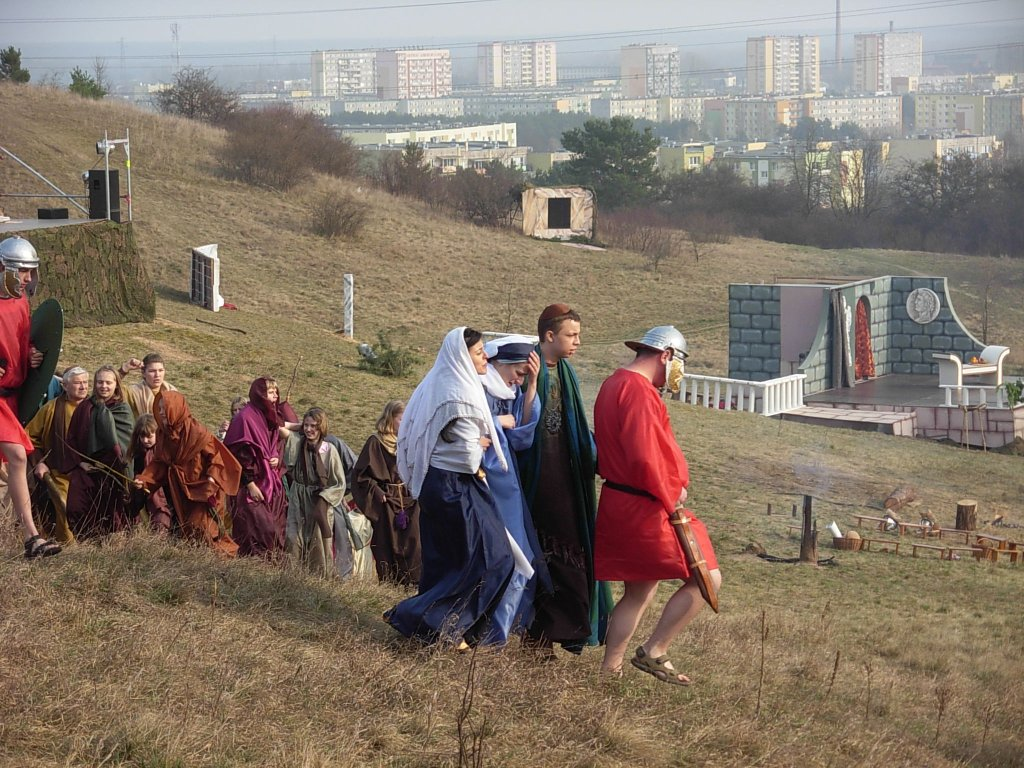
Bydgoszcz Passion Play in a ravine of the Fordon Slope

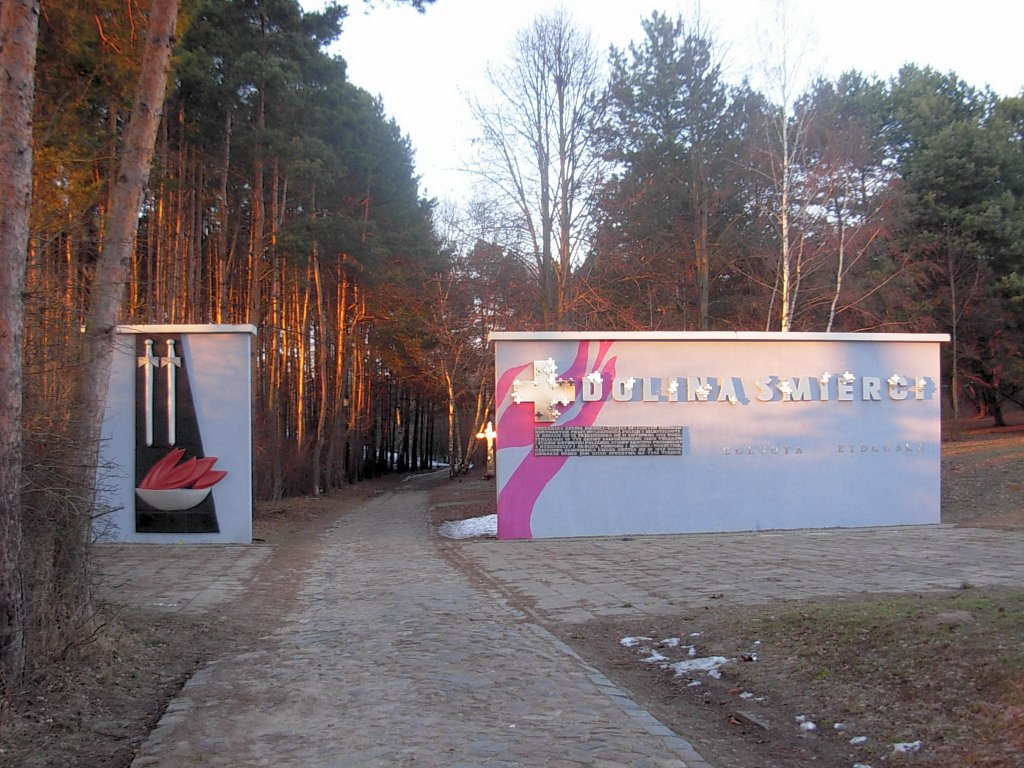
Valley of Death

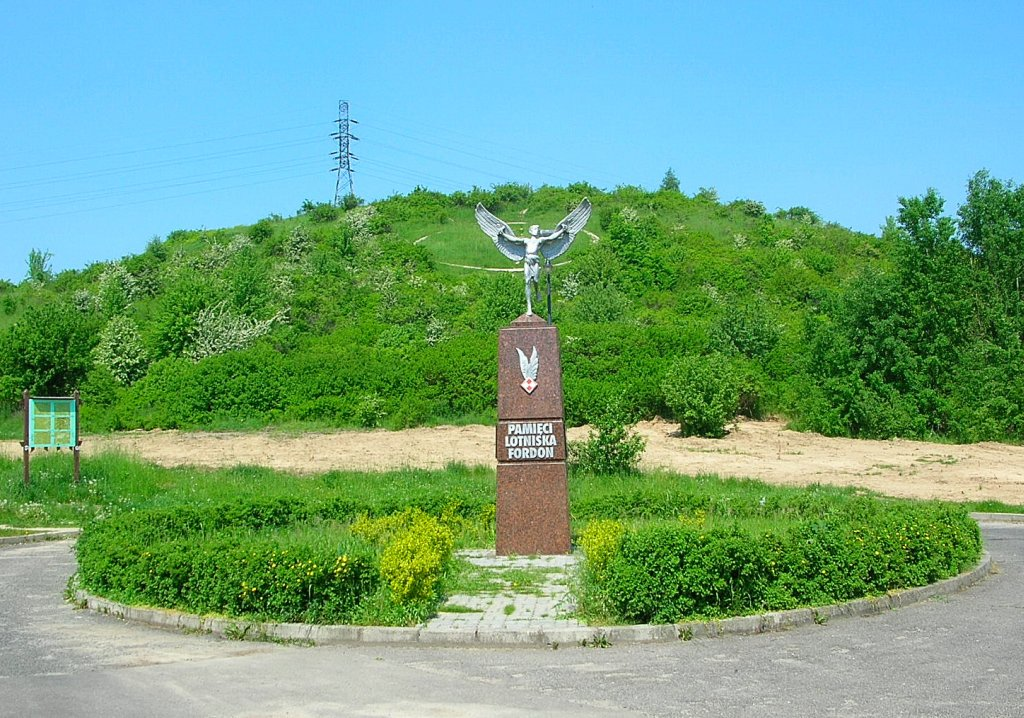
Glider Hill as the backdrop for the Icarus monument

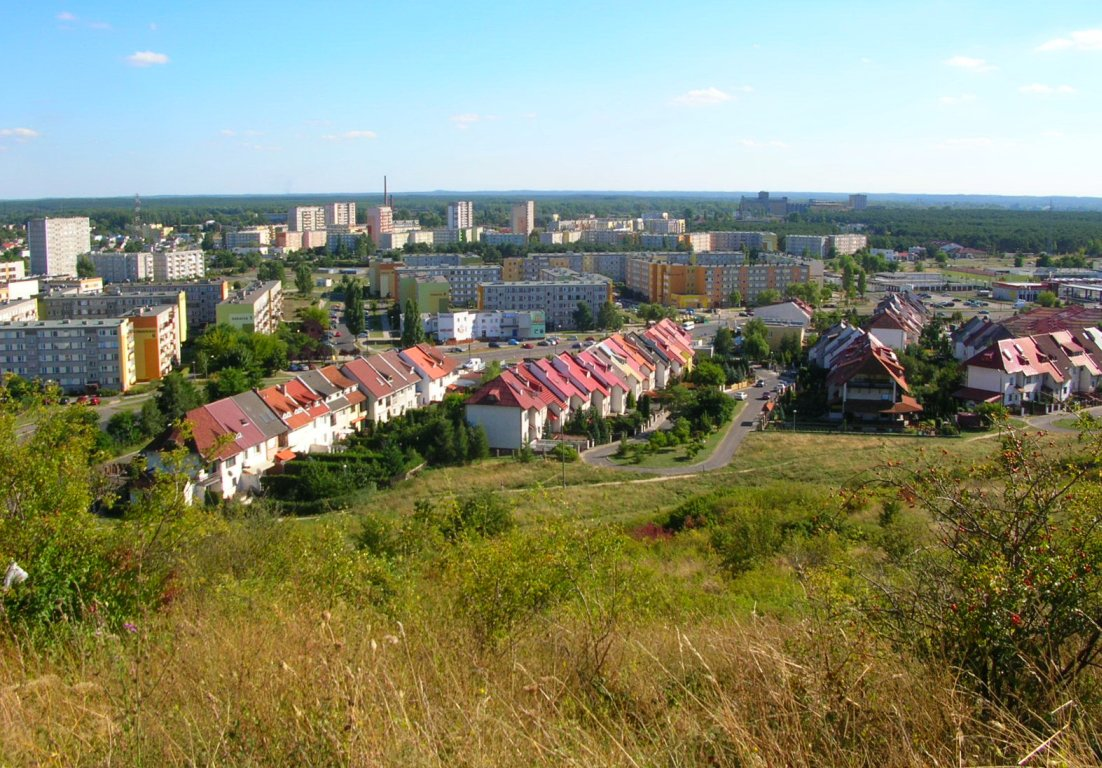
View from Glider Hill

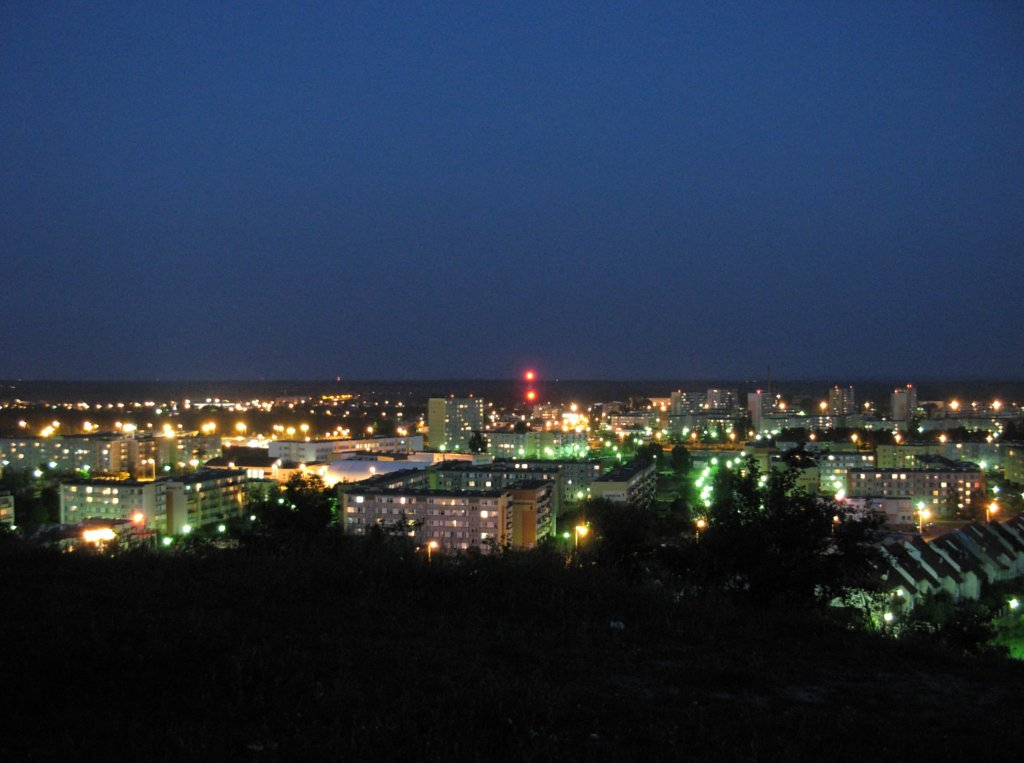
Fordon district at dusk from the Fordon Slope

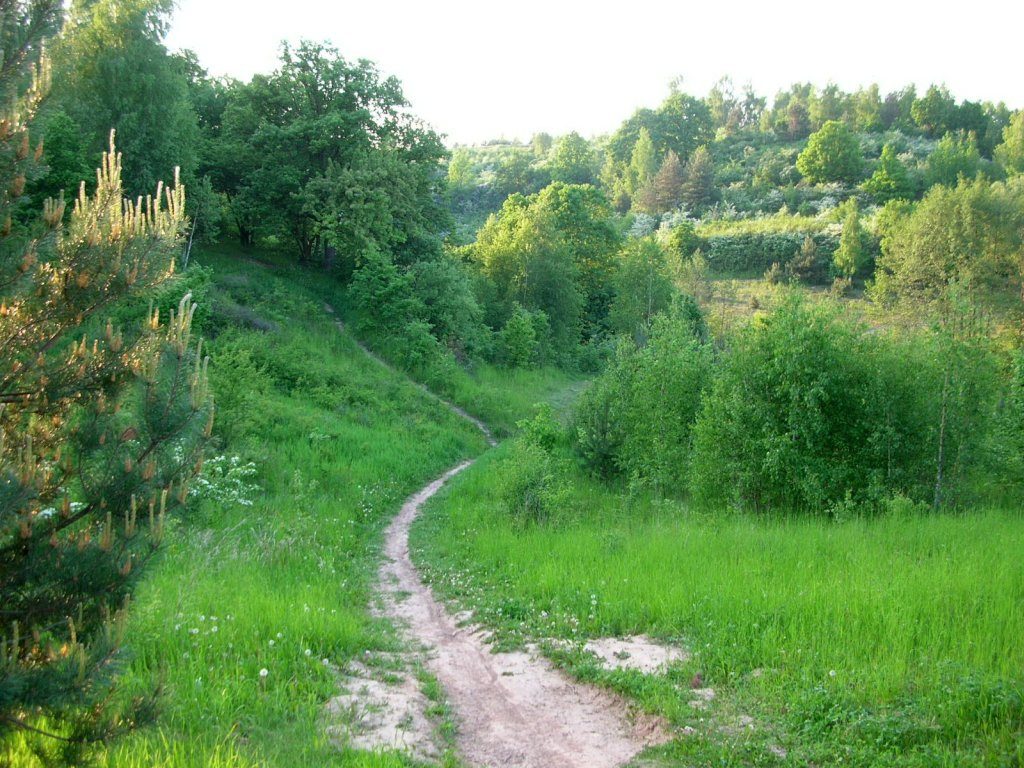
Fordon Valleys

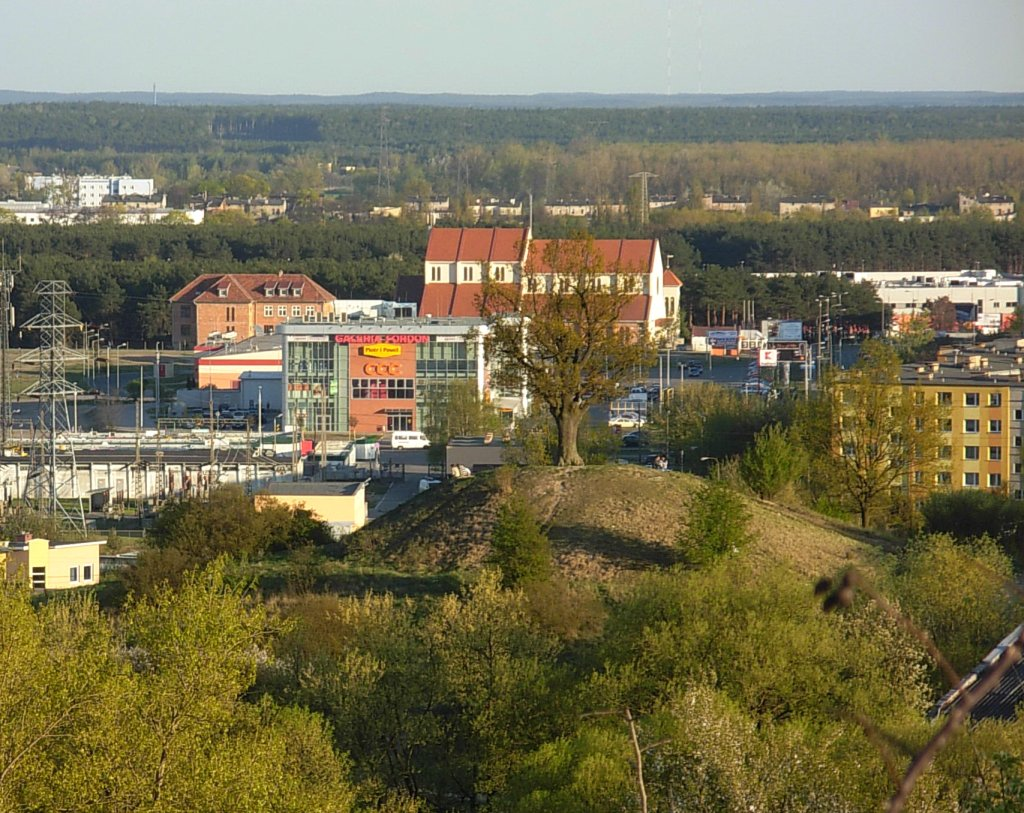
Napoleon's Oak with Fordon in the background

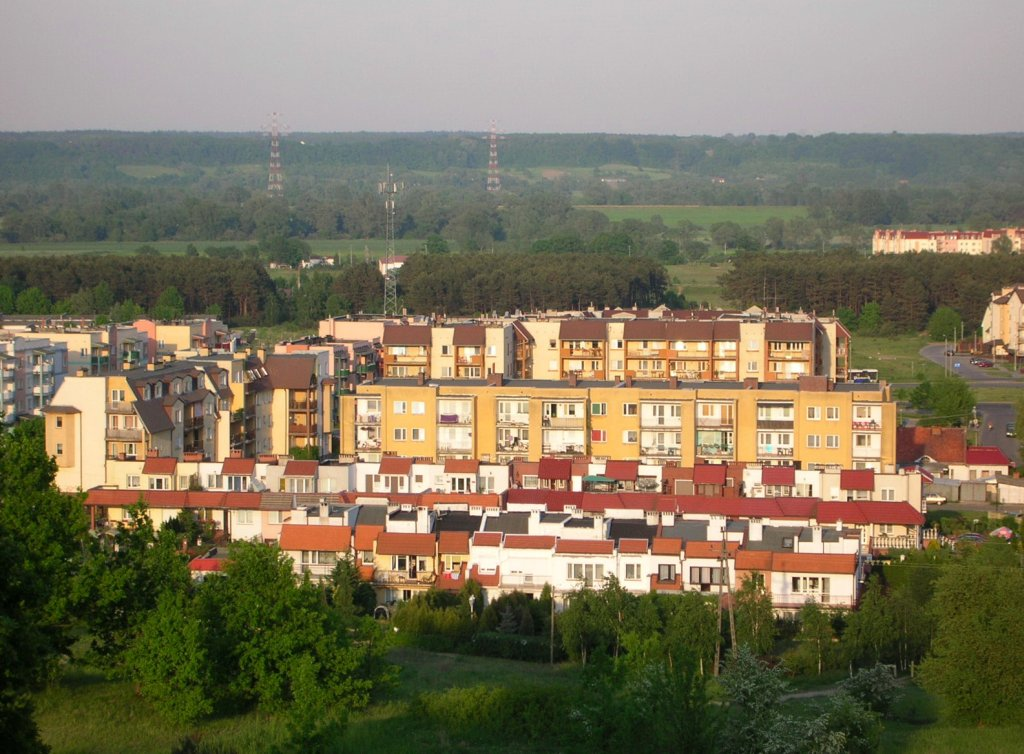
View of Tatrzańskie Estate

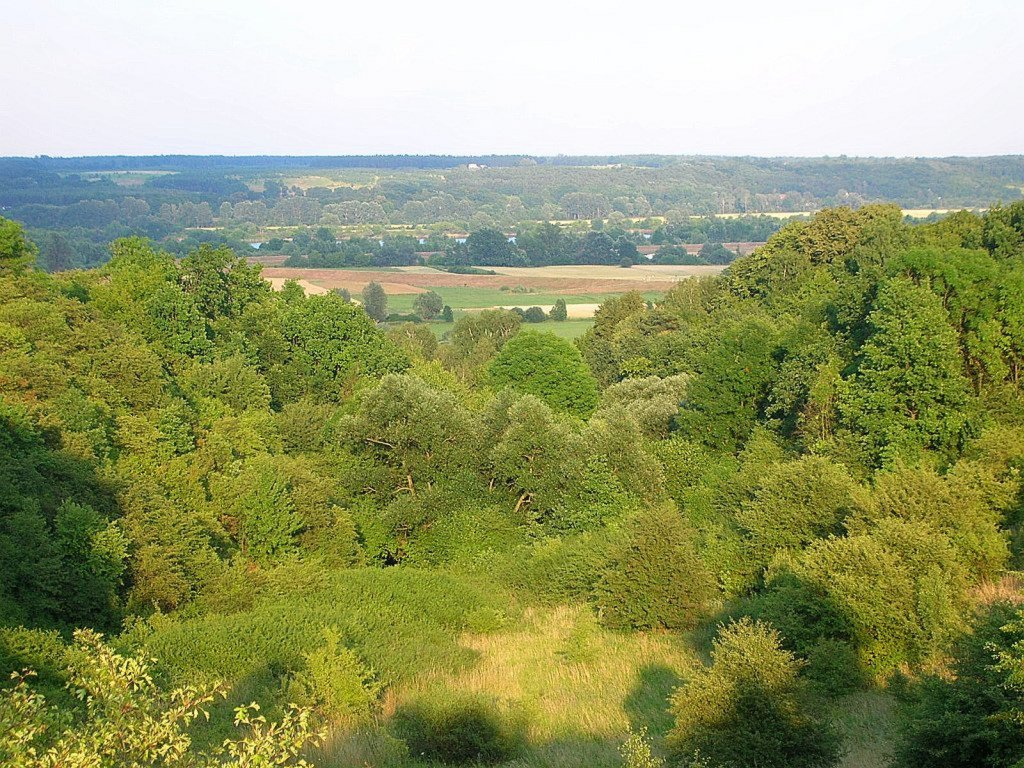
Prodnia scenic area in Jarużyn

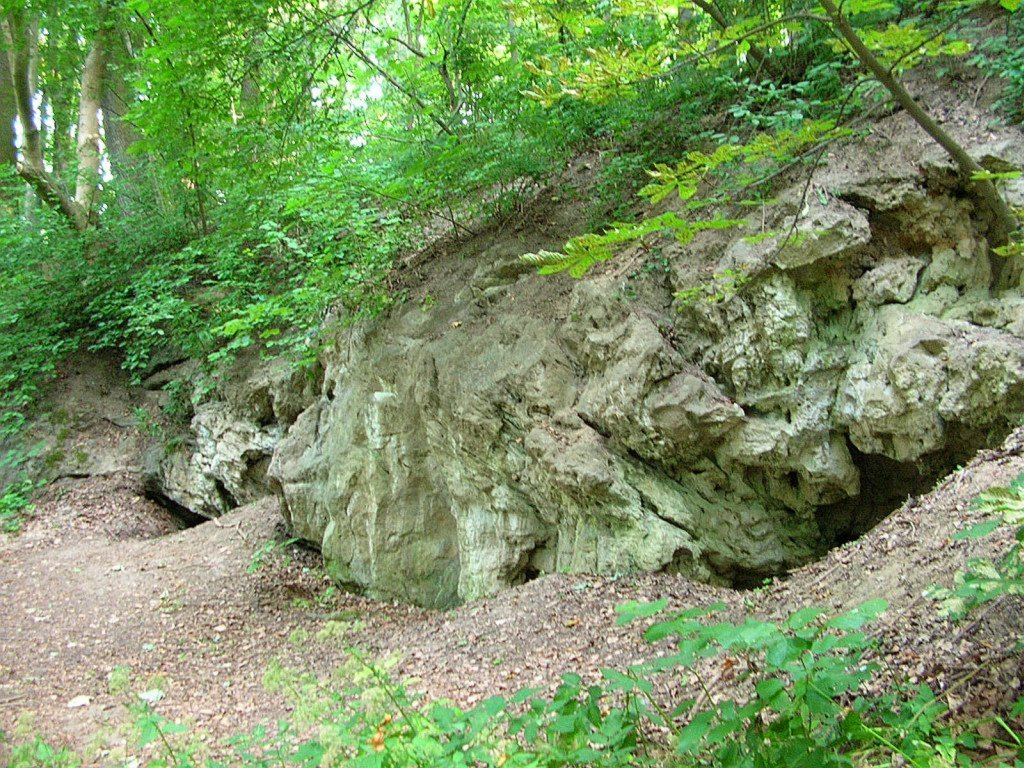
Bajka Cave system in a ravine of the Fordon Slope in Gądecz

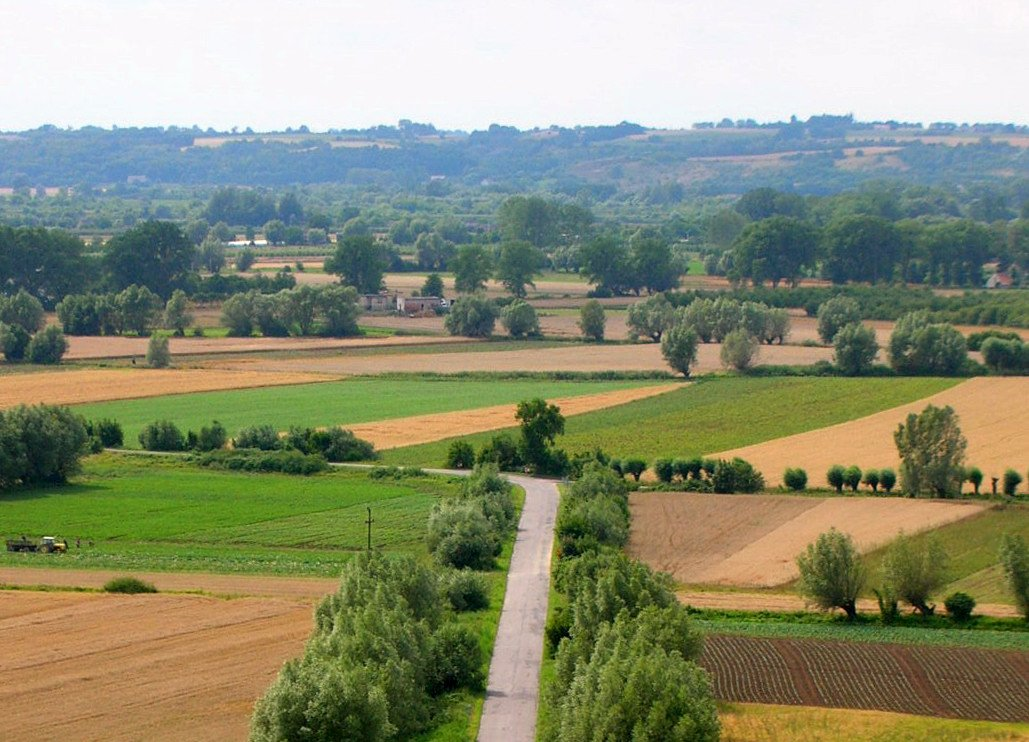
Fordon Slope seen from the right edge of the Lower Vistula Valley (near Starogród)

The Fordon Slope is a physical-geographical microregion in northern Poland, spanning the gminas of Bydgoszcz, Osielsko, Dobrcz, Pruszcz, and Świecie. It forms the southern and eastern boundary of the Świecie Upland.

The Fordon Slope encompasses part of the northern edge zone of the Toruń-Eberswalde Urstromtal and the western slope of the Lower Vistula Valley. It is the most ecologically diverse natural feature in Bydgoszcz and one of the most notable in the Kuyavian-Pomeranian Voivodeship.

The Fordon Slope is classified within the Świecie Upland mesoregion due to its landscape genesis, lithological-stratigraphic characteristics, and plant community types. However, it also influences the landscape of the Fordon Valley.

== Location ==
The microregion covers a narrow strip (600–1,500 m wide) along the northern slope zone of the Toruń Basin in Bydgoszcz, from Rynkowo to Fordon. Starting at the pivotal Glider Hill in Fordon, the slope extends northeast, forming the western edge of the Fordon Valley. It borders the Świecie Upland microregions of Osielsko Upland and Strzelce Upland to the north and west. The Fordon Vistula Gorge occurs between Fordon and Strzelce Dolne.

== Geological history ==
The Fordon Slope formed in a periglacial climate at the end of the Weichselian glaciation (approximately 14,000–12,000 years ago). Its formation resulted from lateral erosion by flowing waters and denudation processes.

During the retreat of glacial meltwaters mixed with river waters flowing from southern Poland along the ice front westward, the Toruń-Eberswalde Urstromtal formed, including an expansion known as the Toruń Basin. The Fordon Slope was the northern edge of this urstromtal, one of the largest in Poland. As waters flowed, the urstromtal deepened, widened, and formed terraces, increasing the relative height of the Fordon Slope. Around 12,000 years ago, the proto-Vistula underwent bifurcation, flowing both westward and northward along the Lower Vistula Valley for about 1,000 years. Faster incision in the northern valley halted westward flow, stopping erosion that increased the slope's height between Myślęcinek and Fordon, while intensifying it between Fordon and Świecie.

The low level of the forming Baltic Sea (Baltic Ice Lake) caused significant deepening of the Lower Vistula Valley by the river. Later, during the Littorina Sea phase (8,000–4,000 years ago), fluvial sediment accumulation prevailed, raising the valley floor by several metres. Currently, the slope's height is approximately 40 m in the urstromtal section and up to 60 m in the Lower Vistula Valley.

Subsequent denudation shaped the slope further. Unstabilized by vegetation, it experienced landslides, downhill creeps, and washout by rainwater and groundwater. This eroded sand and till, depositing material at the slope's base as alluvial fans. Extensive systems of denudational valleys formed, with multiple branches and depressions (landslide niches, hanging valleys). The largest systems developed near Zamczysko Street, Armii Krajowej Street, and Sądecka Street. Between them, erosional outliers remained as hills and peaks.

After climate warming, root systems stabilized the terrain. Today, erosion persists mainly through groundwater outflows and human impacts. Mass movements may occur where vegetation is removed.

== Characteristics ==
The Fordon Slope has distinct morphological boundaries: the edge of the moraine upland, the slope's base, and the upper sections of erosional valleys and gullies. The zone averages 600–800 m wide but reaches 1.5 km in areas like Myślęcinek, Czarnówczyn, Mariampol, and Strzelce Górne. Narrow (up to 100 m) erosional terraces of the Vistula valley also occur within the slope zone.

Relative heights range from 35 to 40 m (maximum 44 m) in the urstromtal section, and from 55 to 60 m (maximum 68 m) in the Holocene Vistula valley. Slopes reach from 40 to 50°, and in cases of intense erosion, rockfall, or landslides, up to 90°. Beneath a cover of slope deposits, outcrops of 3–4 layers of moraine till, local stagnant water deposits (silts, clay, lake chalk), and glaciofluvial deposits of sand and gravel are found.

=== Hydrology ===
The microregion is rich in springs, seeps, and streams. Water outflows occur at three levels: the slope's base, 20–25 m, and approximately 40 m above the valley floor. The middle aquifer, feeding springs in the lower slope, is the most significant and perennial. The upper aquifer is seasonal, appearing with sufficient precipitation on the upland.

Spring yields are typically 0.1–0.3 L/s, with stream flows up to 4–5 L/s. Surface water and shallow groundwater contribute significantly to their recharge. Due to small catchment areas (up to a few hundred metres from the edge), seasonal flow variations can reach 100%.

Streams utilize and reshape late-glacial valley networks, many of which no longer have surface flow. Some valleys have artificial ponds created by damming (Myślęcinek, Czarnówczyn, Fordon, Jarużyn). Several streams are partially regulated or channelized. Their waters typically do not reach the Brda or Vistula directly, infiltrating into the sandy urstromtal floor.

=== Valleys ===
A defining feature of the microregion is a system of heavily denudation-shaped valleys. Subject to deepening erosion, these valleys have steep gradients (4–5%) and active denudational processes on their slopes (rockfall, landslides, sloughing). Slopes are heavily altered by human activities, including ploughing, pasture creation, and orchard terracing, resulting in relatively low forested areas.

=== Soils ===
Soils are predominantly deluvial soils (typical and brown). In valleys, humic deluvial soils, wetland soils, and peat-mud or silt soils prevail. Initial soils and anthropogenic soils also occur.

=== Microclimates ===
Due to its varied terrain, hydrology, and vegetation, the Fordon Slope hosts a unique array of topoclimates, unparalleled in Bydgoszcz. These include:

- Topoclimates of different exposures: southern, eastern, western, and northern.
- Topoclimates of open and forested areas.
- Topoclimates of dry and wet areas, local fogs, inversions, and cold air flows.

These topoclimate characteristics are particularly noticeable under specific weather conditions influenced by global climate factors.

=== Vegetation ===
The Fordon Slope is one of the most ecologically diverse natural features in Bydgoszcz and the lowland zone, due to its wide range of biotopes (from dry to wet) and diverse biocenoses.

Preserved forests are often typical or slope oak-hornbeam forests, sometimes planted oak stands resembling thermophilous oak woodland. Former pastures, typically in edge zones (sometimes very dry), feature mesophilic shrub communities of hawthorn, rose, blackthorn, barberry, and xerothermic grassland. Valleys with water flow host riparian forests with common alder, occasional aspen, and white willow. Seep zones are dominated by reed beds and great horsetail, with aspen and white willow thickets. Peatlands occur at spring sites, supporting rich lower flora (algae, moss, liverworts). Stream mouths form alluvial fans, often waterlogged, with alder-ash, elm-ash, or fertile low oak-hornbeam forest communities.

Human-planted forests include pine forests (Myślęcinek, Czarnówczyn, Jarużyn) and beech forests (Myślęcinek, Gądecz). Old orchards and former pastures undergo ecological succession, regenerating natural vegetation.

== Nature conservation ==
The Fordon Slope lies entirely within the Lower Vistula Landscape Parks Complex. Protected natural features include:

- The proposed Kozielec Nature Reserve floristic reserve for its xerothermic grassland communities.
- The proposed Cieleszyński Ravine landscape reserve, encompassing a deep, branched ravine with unique conglomerate and sandstone Pleistocene deposits.
- The Gruczno Bromus Ravine Nature Reserve, protecting xerothermic grassland.

The publication Środowisko przyrodnicze Bydgoszczy proposes additional areas for legal protection in Bydgoszcz, including several Fordon Slope features:

Name	Location	Description	Proposed protection
Myślęcinek valleys	Forest Park of Culture and Recreation	A system of erosional valleys and a slope zone with oak-hornbeam forest, oak woodland, and riparian forest communities. The area features varied terrain and local groundwater seeps. Forest communities include typical oak-hornbeam forest understory species (greater stitchwort, common hepatica, asarabacca, spring vetchling, yellow archangel) and riparian forest species (alternate-leaved golden-saxifrage, common nettle, wood anemone).	Partial nature reserve
Fordon valleys	Fordon Slope near Zofin	A system of erosional valleys in the Lower Vistula Valley slope zone, with xerothermic grassland in edge zones and riparian forest in valley bottoms. The area has significant elevation differences and steep slopes, with evolving shrub communities and quasi-xerothermic grassland.	Partial nature reserve
Botanical Garden of the Forest Park of Culture and Recreation	Forest Park of Culture and Recreation	A valley with ponds formed on the Myślęcinek Stream, featuring lowland beech forest, oak-hornbeam forest, riparian forest, and parkland trees. The garden hosts protected plant species from various habitats (peatlands, forests, xerothermic, meadows, aquatic). It is a highly scenic and recreational part of Forest Park of Culture and Recreation.	Ecological site
Zamczysko	Near Armii Krajowej and Zamczysko streets	A system of valleys and an erosional upland spur with a Slavic hillfort. Valley bottoms have alder riparian forest, while slopes and the upland feature oak woodland and pine forest on oak-hornbeam forest habitats.	Ecological site
Czarnówczyn	Czarnówczyn, on the border of Bydgoszcz and Osielsko	A section of a large valley with a small stream, featuring riparian forest (including common alder), a partially waterlogged bottom, and groundwater seeps.	Ecological site

== Recreational value ==
The Fordon Slope is one of the most valuable natural features in Bydgoszcz and its surroundings, due to its scenic landscapes and ecological diversity. Key microclimate benefits include high levels of negative ions and production of phytoaerosols with detoxifying, immune-boosting, and circulatory and respiratory benefits.

It is one of Bydgoszcz's two main scenic promenades, offering views of the city and the Fordon Vistula Gorge. Notable hills include Myślęcinek Hill, providing views of the city 4 km away, Zamczysko with its hillfort, and Glider Hill, at the junction of three geomorphological units. From the Forest Park of Culture and Recreation to the Bydgoszcz County border at Kozielec, the slope is dotted with dozens of ravines, arroyos, valleys, and other erosional forms.

In 2018, a viewing tower was planned between Tatrzańska and Świętokrzyska streets in Fordon, funded by the participatory budget.

=== Main valleys and ravines ===
Name	Location	Description	Protection
Rynkowo arroyo	Rynkowo	An anthropogenically altered arroyo hosting the Chorzów Batory–Tczew railway. It marks the boundary between the Świecie Upland and the Brda Sandur Valley.	
Myślęcinek valleys	Forest Park of Culture and Recreation (western part)	A group of forested valleys and arroyos with oak-hornbeam forest (beech forest, oak woodland) and riparian forest understory species. Numerous walking paths traverse the forest.	Proposed partial nature reserve
Zacisze Scenic Area	Forest Park of Culture and Recreation	A clearing at the foot of hills with beech forest. It features a natural monument groundwater spring, a cascade of ponds fed by the Zacisze Stream, an educational nature trail, and the Kuyavian-Pomeranian Ecological Education Centre.	
Valley along Rekreacyjna Street	Forest Park of Culture and Recreation	The Rynkowska Stream flows through the valley bottom, with a park promenade along its western slope.	
Botanical Garden valley	Forest Park of Culture and Recreation (eastern part)	The Myślęcinek Stream runs through the valley, forming a cascade of ponds with rich aquatic vegetation. The varied slopes (up to 30 m elevation difference) and ravines are integrated with walking paths in the Bydgoszcz Botanical Garden. Plant habitats are connected by trails. An alpine garden lies on the western slope, and a horse stable on the eastern side.	Proposed ecological site
Zamczysko arroyo complex	East of Armii Krajowej Street	One of the most complex valley systems in the Fordon Slope. At the top of an upland spur (Zamczysko Hill, 95.6 m above sea level) is a pre-Slavic hillfort. The eastern part contains remnants of an anti-aircraft defence radar base. Valley bottoms have alder riparian forest, while slopes and the upland feature oak woodland and pine forest.	Proposed ecological site
Czarnówczyn valley	Czarnówczyn	A valley with Czarnówczyn settlement buildings and a road to Osielsko. It features riparian forest, with ponds formed by damming the stream. The eastern slopes include the Jastrzębie Forest complex.	Proposed ecological site
Czarnówka arroyos	Opposite Eskulapa neighbourhood in Fordon	Valleys with riparian forest, drained by streams, separated by upland spurs with successional vegetation, including blackthorn shrubs.	
Valley of Death	Opposite Przylesie and Osiedle Bohaterów neighbourhoods in Fordon	A valley where Nazi forces executed approximately 1,200 people in autumn 1939. A Stations of the Cross path runs along the valley, with mass graves at its upper end. It is part of the martyrological park. Monuments include one for the victims (1975) and the "Gate to Heaven" (2009). Annual Passion Plays and public processions are held here.	
Fordon valleys	Opposite Szybowników, Tatrzańskie, Zofin, and Independence neighbourhoods in Fordon	A series of arroyos and valleys drained by streams along the Lower Vistula Valley slope. Upland spurs are unforested, while valley bottoms have riparian forest. Edge zones feature xerothermic grassland. Slopes contain seeps (e.g., Mieczysław spring). The area has significant elevation differences and steep slopes, with erosional forms like incised valley, gullies, arêtes, isolated hills, and miniature ridges. Napoleon's Oak grows on one hill.	Proposed partial nature reserve
Księży Las arroyo	Mariampol	A large, branched arroyo with light oak forest and mixed forest. A road to Mariampol Górny runs through its bottom.	
Jarużyn arroyo	South of Jarużyn	A deep, hard-to-access, forested valley drained by a stream. A natural monument spring, "Jarużyn's Eyes", is on the slope. The valley curves upward toward Jarużyn.	
Prodnia scenic area	Jarużyn	A wide, drained valley offering panoramic views of the Fordon Vistula Gorge, the narrowest valley section from the Lesser Poland Upland to the Baltic Sea. A path through the valley allows exploration.	Ecological site (since 17 March 2000)
Strzelce arroyos	Strzelce Górne, Strzelce Dolne	An asphalt road connecting Strzelce Górne and Strzelce Dolne runs along the arroyo slope, offering views of the Vistula valley with a 60 m height difference. A dome-shaped hill (96.3 m above sea level) on the northern edge is a remnant of a Slavic tribal defensive fort (7th–12th centuries).	
Gądecz arroyo	Gądecz	A deep gorge drained by a stream with steep slopes covered in beech forest, a remnant of a 19th-century landscape park transitioning to a slope oak-hornbeam forest. The southern slope contains a cave system in sandy conglomerate, a unique natural monument in northern Poland, with the largest named Bajka Cave.	
Trzęsacz arroyo	Trzęsacz, Kozielec	A branched valley starting in Włóki and leading to Trzęsacz. An asphalt road climbs the upland via a hairpin turn. The summit offers views of the Vistula approaching from Fordon. The slope between Trzęsacz and Kozielec is undercut by the Vistula, forming a cliff-like feature similar to those in Wyszogród, near Świecie (Diabelce Hills, Wiąskie Hills, Czarcie Hills), and Grudziądz (Łosiowe Hills).	

== Tourist trails ==
=== Vistula trail ===
The green pedestrian tourist trail "Vistula" runs along the Fordon Slope (on the upland and valley bottom), connecting Bydgoszcz Leśna to Świecie over 52 km. It allows exploration of notable natural features and settlements along the left slope of the Lower Vistula Valley.

=== Jeremi Przybora trail ===
In 2010, the red pedestrian tourist trail "Jeremi Przybora" (14.4 km) was established along the Bydgoszcz section of the Fordon Slope, from Forest Park of Culture and Recreation to Mariampol. It is named after poet and actor Jeremi Przybora, creator of the Kabaret Starszych Panów, who was linked to Bydgoszcz and Fordon. In the interwar period, he studied at the Mikołaj Kopernik Gymnasium, trained with the Bydgoszcz Rowing Association, and lived at his grandfather's estate in Miedzyń Wielki near the Fordon Slope. From 1945 to 1948, he worked at the Pomorska Radio Station in Bydgoszcz.

The trail starts at the Myślęcinek bus loop, running along the slope's base to Zamczysko, where visitors can climb to the early medieval hillfort and explore a former 1965–1987 anti-aircraft defence radar base. It continues along the edge of Gdańsk Forest and through the Jastrzębie Forest to the Valley of Death. The final stretch follows the slope's edge through ravines and valleys to the Mariampol bus loop, passing Napoleon's Oak and the Mieczysław spring.

=== Zygmunt Trybowski trail ===
In 2008, the Zygmunt Trybowski trail was established, allowing exploration of the Fordon Slope within Fordon. It is named after the founder and first parish priest of the Our Lady Queen of Martyrs Parish in Bydgoszcz, an enthusiast of the Fordon hills, a devotee of the Valley of Death, and the visionary behind the Sanctuary of the Queen of Martyrs.
