= Fordon =

Fordon may refer to:

- Fordon, East Riding of Yorkshire, England
- Fordon, Bydgoszcz, district in Bydgoszcz, Poland
- Fordon Slope, physical-geographical microregion in northern Poland
- Fordon Valley of Death, a site of Nazi German mass murder committed at the beginning of World War II
