= Synagogue of Fordon (Bydgoszcz) =

Synagogue in Bydgoszcz, Poland

Coordinates: 53°08′55.1″N 18°10′16.6″E

- Synagoga w Bydgoszczy-Fordonie
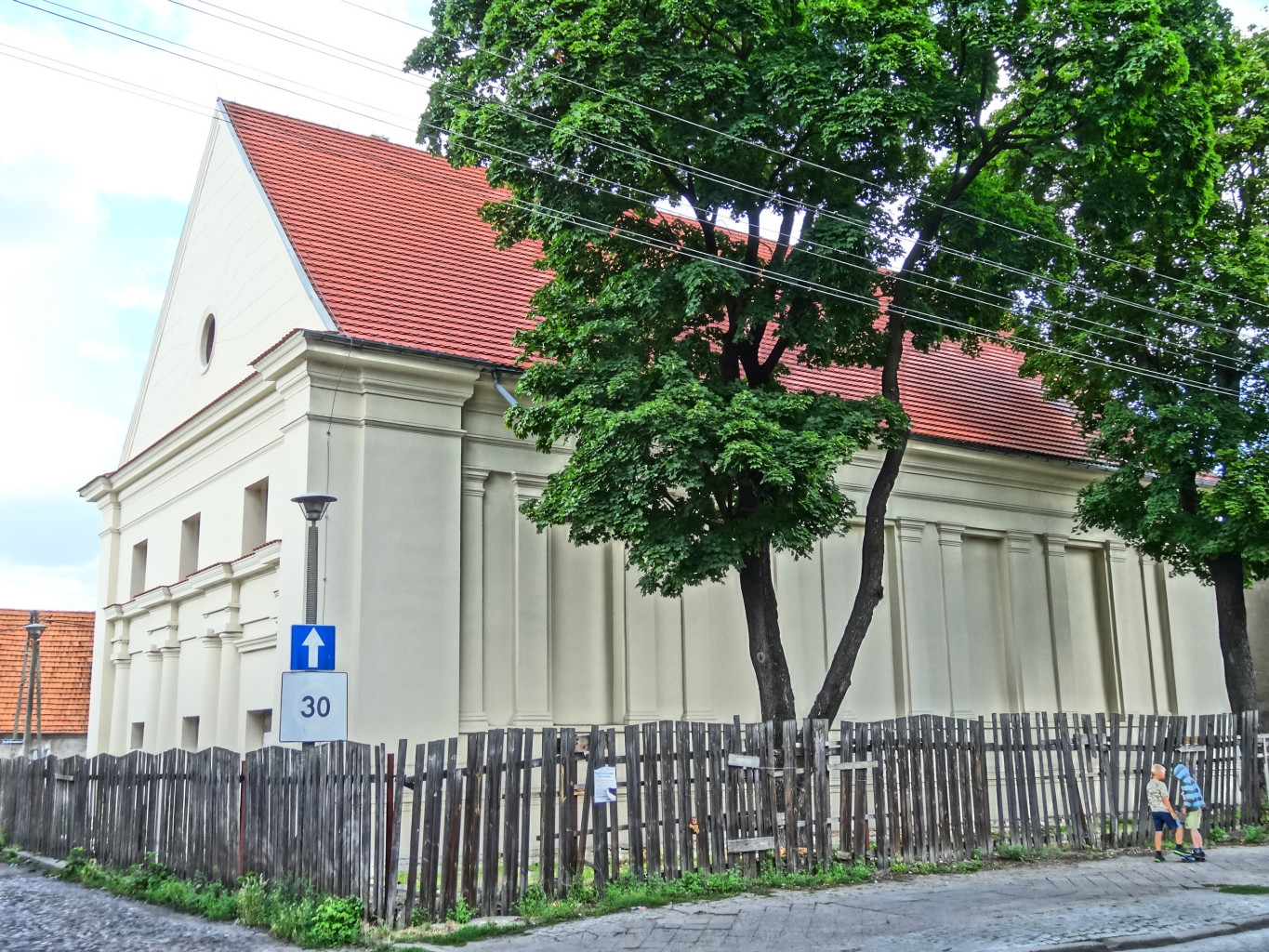
- Synagogue of Fordon

Religion
- Affiliation: Judaism
- Region: Kuyavian-Pomeranian Voivodeship
- Year consecrated: 1832
- Status: Preserved, Museum

Location
- Location: Bydgoszcz
- Country: Poland
- Interactive map of Synagogue of Fordon (Bydgoszcz)

Architecture
- Groundbreaking: 1825
- Completed: 1832

The Synagogue of Fordon is a synagogue located in the city of Bydgoszcz, in the Fordon district. It has been active from the 1830s till the World War II. The edifice is located in the old town of Fordon, 300 metres (980 ft) from the Vistula river. Registered on the Kuyavian-Pomeranian Voivodeship Heritage list on 25 May 1991, it is one of the largest surviving synagogues in this part of the Kuyavian-Pomeranian Voivodeship.

== Previous Synagogues ==
The first mention of a Jewsish community in the then town of Fordon dates back to the late 16th century. Surviving records from other parts of Kujavia attest that a synagogue existed in 1596 in the neighbouring village of Miedzyń (2.5 kilometres (1.6 mi) north-west of Fordon). It is believed that a synagogue was built in Fordon quite quickly, but it probably burned down during a massive city fire in 1617.

The first identified mention of a synagogue in Fordon goes back to 1649: it was initially located on the market square, but was later moved to another location. The edifice was probably built of wood and burned down in the spring of 1656, during the Swedish invasions, along with the entire town. After this event, the town council changed in 1660 the plot of land where the synagogue could be re-constructed: located in the city center, the new synagogue was still made of wood. The building is regularly referred to in historical documents (1666, 1699, 1702, 1712, 1726 and 1734).

In 1761, Antoni Sebastian Dembowski (1682–1763), then bishop of Kujawy, authorized the construction of a new synagogue on the site of the old one: 15.24 metres (50.0 ft) long, 8.8 metres (29 ft) large and 4.1 metres (13 ft) high. That same year, the Jewish community began working on the foundations. Unbeknownst to city authorities, they enlarged the building's dimensions (17.43 metres (57.2 ft) long, 12 metres (39 ft) large). According to documents, it appears to have been completed by 1781.

Due to the lack of historical sources, it is difficult to precisely reconstruct the synagoque's exact features. However, according to a few records and similar buildings located in Kujawy, it is estimated that the building had a stone foundation. Its eastern part was occupied by a square main hall, adjoined on the west by a vestibule, with women's gallery on the first floor, accessible by an external staircase. It is assumed that the edifice was made of wood (walls and roof) and that the interior was clad with a layer of clay on a reed net. This synagogue burned down during a city fire that occurred between 1820 and 1825.

== Last Synagogue ==
In the first half of the 18th century, the local Jewish community was 1,400 people strong. The new synagogue was planned for housing 500 men, 250 women and 20 places for guests. The building cost was 10,000 Thalers at the time, but designer and builders are unknown. Recent dendrochronological studies of the timber roof truss revealed that the current synagogue's cover was built in 1827–1828, with indications that the start of construction of the brick and stone part took place shortly before those years.

Foundations are rectangular: 27 metres (89 ft) by 15.5 metres (51 ft). Once completed, the Fordon synagogue competed in terms of splendor with the one in Poznań.

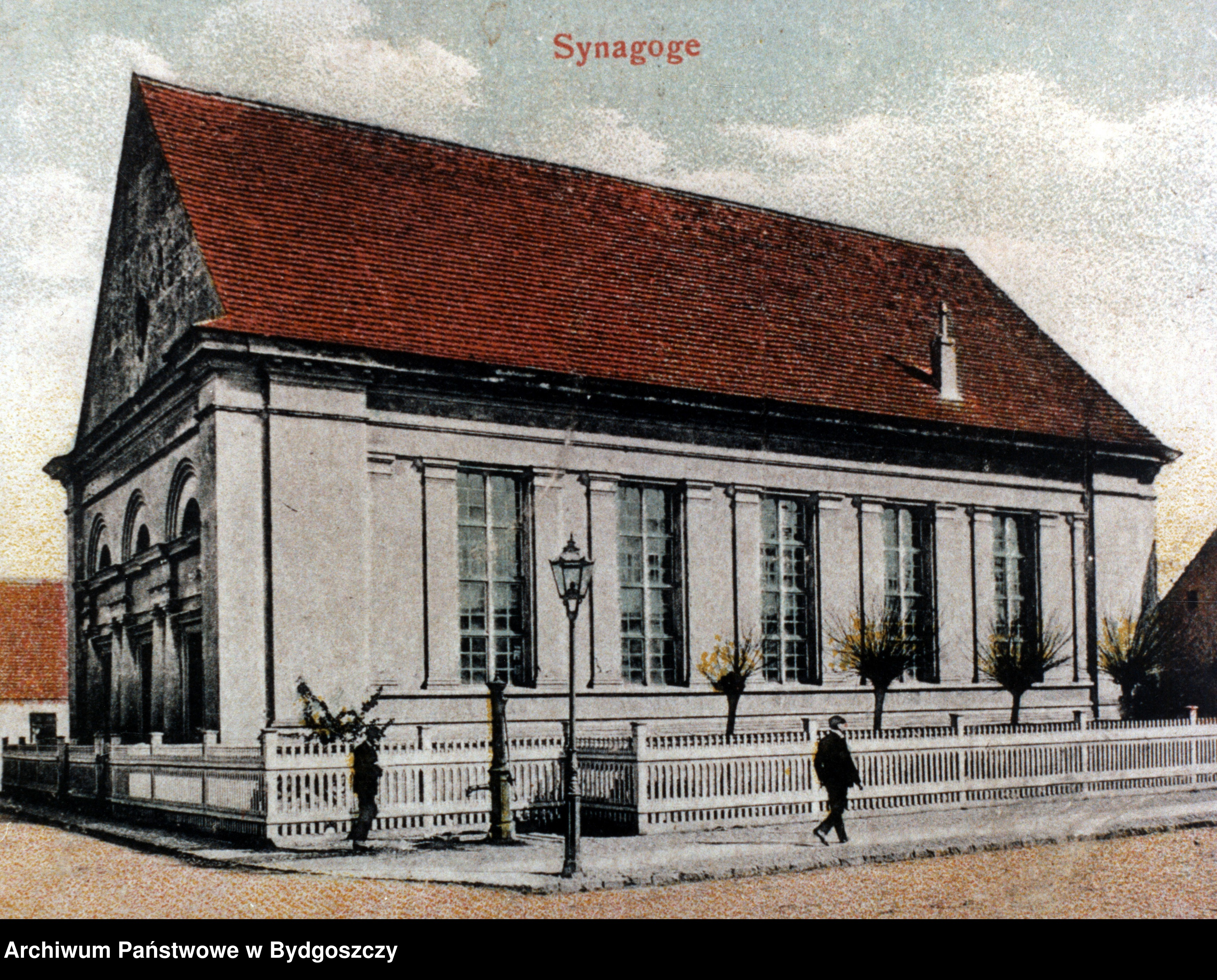
View of the Fordon synagogue Fordon ca 1905

The interwar period iconography provides details of the building appearance: on a rectangular footprint, it displayed classicist features topped with a gable roof, thus creating a compact structure with a longitudinal layout along an east–west axis. Above the foundation ran a high pedestal with a richly profiled cornice. Each quoins of the edifice were trimmed with wide half-pillars and another prominent crowning cornice. The main facade was facing westward. The lower level of the facade was given the form of a recessed portico, with three doorways beneath the entablature. The doorways were adorned with two Tuscan order half-columns. Higher up, the portals were mirrored with semicircular recessed windows.

The rest of the frontage exhibited tall rectangular windows, set between pairs of pilasters. Twelve prominent and uniform window openings were regularly placed (five on the long walls and two on the side), recalling the Twelve Tribes of Israel, which number are also echoed in the twelve gates of Jerusalem.

Three entrances were opened on the facade:

- the central entrance, for men, led to the vestibule and to the lobby, opening onto the main hall;
- side entrances, for women, led up via staircases to the first-floor vestibule, connected to the women's gallery by a semicircular entrance.

Additionally, on the ground floor were a cloakroom (on one side) and the chambers of the community elders (on the other side), where was also stored the synagogue's treasury.

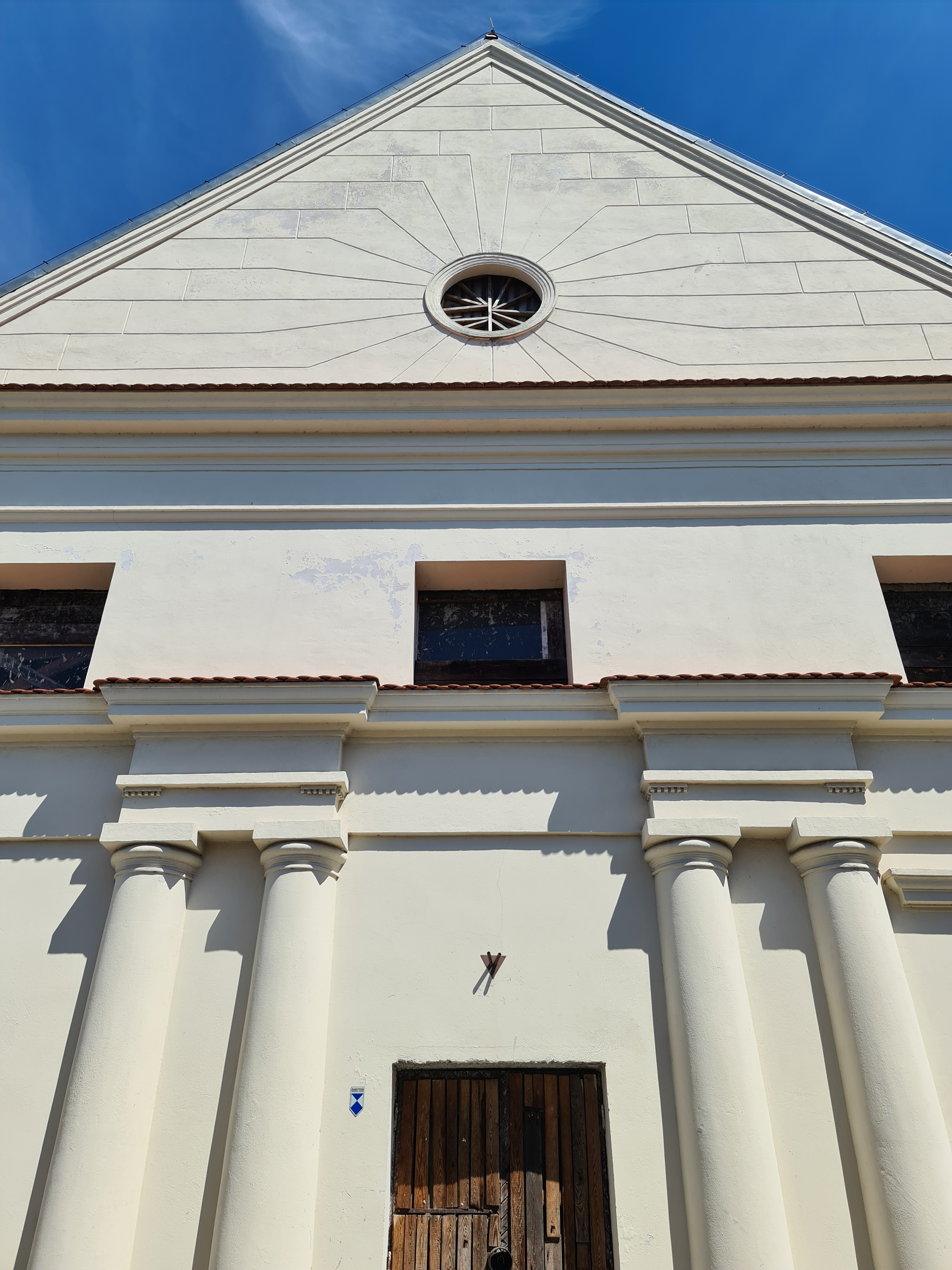
Refurbished facade

The prayer hall occupied two-thirds of the interiors. It had a roughly square footprint and was divided by two rows of columns, supporting the trusses. This specificity gave a feeling of a pseudo-three-nave space, a wider central one and two narrower side ones. The middle of the hall housed the bimah: a large, raised platform, where the Torah scroll was placed on a lectern to be read (non existent today). Adjacent to the hall was a two-story section, housing the women's gallery on the first floor.

The women's gallery was separated from the main hall by a wooden column structure with a high wooden parapet. The women's space had galleries running along the northern and southern prayer walls. The wooden structure of these galleries was supported by brick pillars and wall beams, realized during the 20th century reconstruction. Furthermore, the wooden ceiling was buttressed by six pillars on wooden beams.

All rooms were covered with plastered ceilings. Eight out of the 12 windows were connected to the prayer hall. The four remaining windows (two on each side) were linked to the western section (cloakroom, elders' chamber and the women's gallery). Furthermore, three small, semicircular windows in the façade illuminated the women's gallery vestibule and one semicircular window was integrated to the finial of the Aron Qodesh.

=== Torah ark (Aron Qodesh) ===
The Fordon's Torah Ark was created in 1832 by Samuel Goldbaum, who was then settling in Bydgoszcz. He is supposed to have designed also the Arks' synagogues in the following cities: Kępno, Tilsit and Bydgoszcz (built as well in 1832).

The Aron ha-Kodesh from Fordon, like all Goldbaum's works, has not survived and no iconographic documentation has been preserved. Today, one can only notice the area where it used to stand: a recess in the wall with by brick steps up to 1 meter high. The ensemble, harmoniously integrated into the architectural environment, occupied the entire surface of the eastern wall between a pair of large windows. Any details of the Aron Kodesh's composition from the Fordon synagogue are unknown.

Ancient literature comments that musical instruments were depicted on the outside exterior of the doors, while inside surfaces featured several images or symbols: a menorah, a horn, a bundle of palms (lulav), the staff of Aaron, a table with showbread and a pomegranate. At the beginning of the 20th century, the Jewish community considered the Fordon's Aron Kodesh a true masterpiece.

=== Other elements ===
The remaining furniture are known only from ancient descriptions:

- a carved rabbi's armchair by Samuel Goldbaum;
- a circumcision table (ca 1840), upholstered in damask with embroidered Hebrew inscriptions;
- a candlestick (inventory from 1870);
- a sanctuary lamp (inventory from 1870), then estimated worth 200 thalers.

== History of the synagogue since 1945 ==
The synagogue's current appearance is the result of several adjustments made during and after World War II.

During the Nazi occupation of Poland, the synagogue served initially as a warehouse and then was provisionally adapted to be used as a cinema theater (ca 1942): the prayer hall was converted into an auditorium and the redundant window openings were boarded up. Furthermore, Nazi troops razed the abutting Jewish cemetery and re-used or scattered away the gravestones.

In 1950, renovation and construction work were carried out, aiming at achieving the cinema project. The process deeply changed the aspect and the structure of the edifice:

- almost all of the windows and one of the front entrances were walled up;
- three new exterior door accesses were pierced;
- an annex housing a boiler room was added on the eastern side;
- upper galleries were removed and a projection room was installed on the first floor;
- interior layout was utterly modified, uniformly divided into a vestibule and restrooms.

The cinema was named Robotnik (Worker) and in the 1970s it was renamed Vistula. The theatre operated until 1988.

== Restoration of the synagogue ==
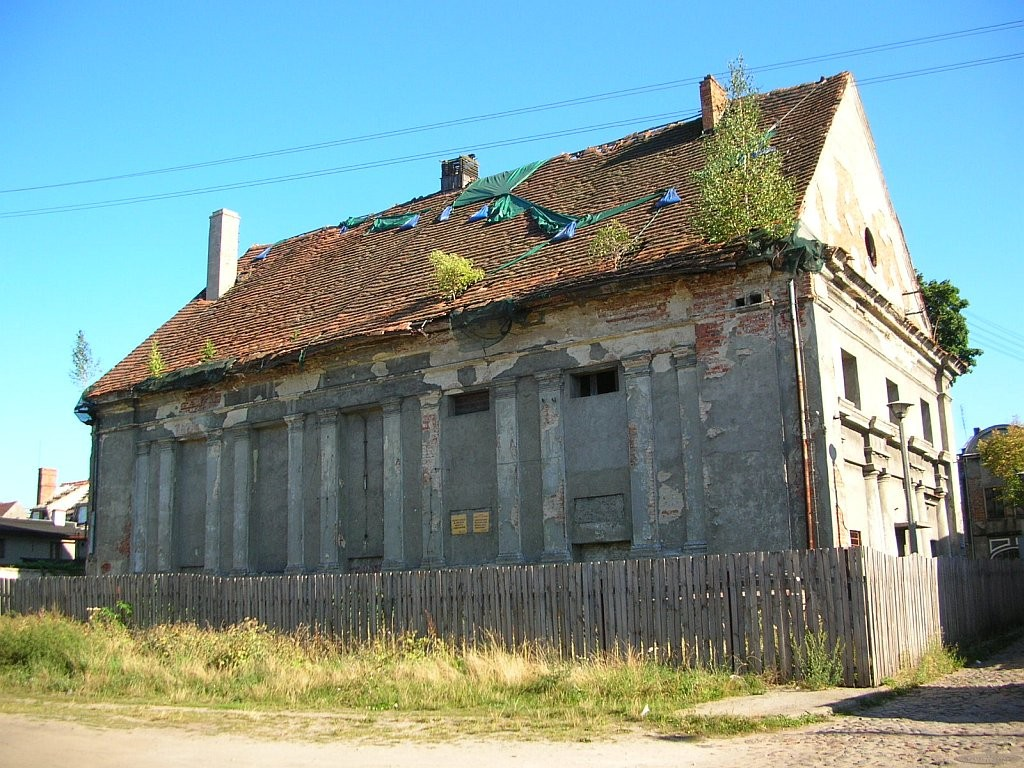
The Fordon Synagogue ca 2000

In 1992, the Association of the Friends of Fordon (Towarzystwo Przyjaciół Fordonu), together with the Fordon Estate Council, applied for the synagogue to be adapted for cultural purposes. Design plans were prepared by Krzysztof Kempa from the KAPPA company: they intended to partially reflect the building's former character and purpose. In this regards, the project design included the restoration of the galleries, the re-opening of the bricked-up side windows and the restoration of the front façade to its original appearance. An underground section included a cloakroom, restrooms and a catering area. The initial cleaning works in and around the synagogue were carried out by youth associations Pokolenie (Generation) and Grupa Czyczkow (Chyczkow Group).

Various cultural events were organized between 1991 and 1993:

- Jewish music concerts;
- sung poetry concerts;
- performances by school choirs;
- school amateur theaters;
- events as part of the Bydgoszcz cultural program.

Unfortunately, disputes over ownership rights put a halt to these initiatives.

In early 2005, the synagogue building was on the verge of collapse. In order to save it from ruins, its management was transferred for free by the Foundation for the Preservation of Jewish Cultural Heritage to the Bydgoszcz Cultural Foundation Yakiza. In 2013, the Foundation for the Kazimierz Wielki University took ownership of the edifice.

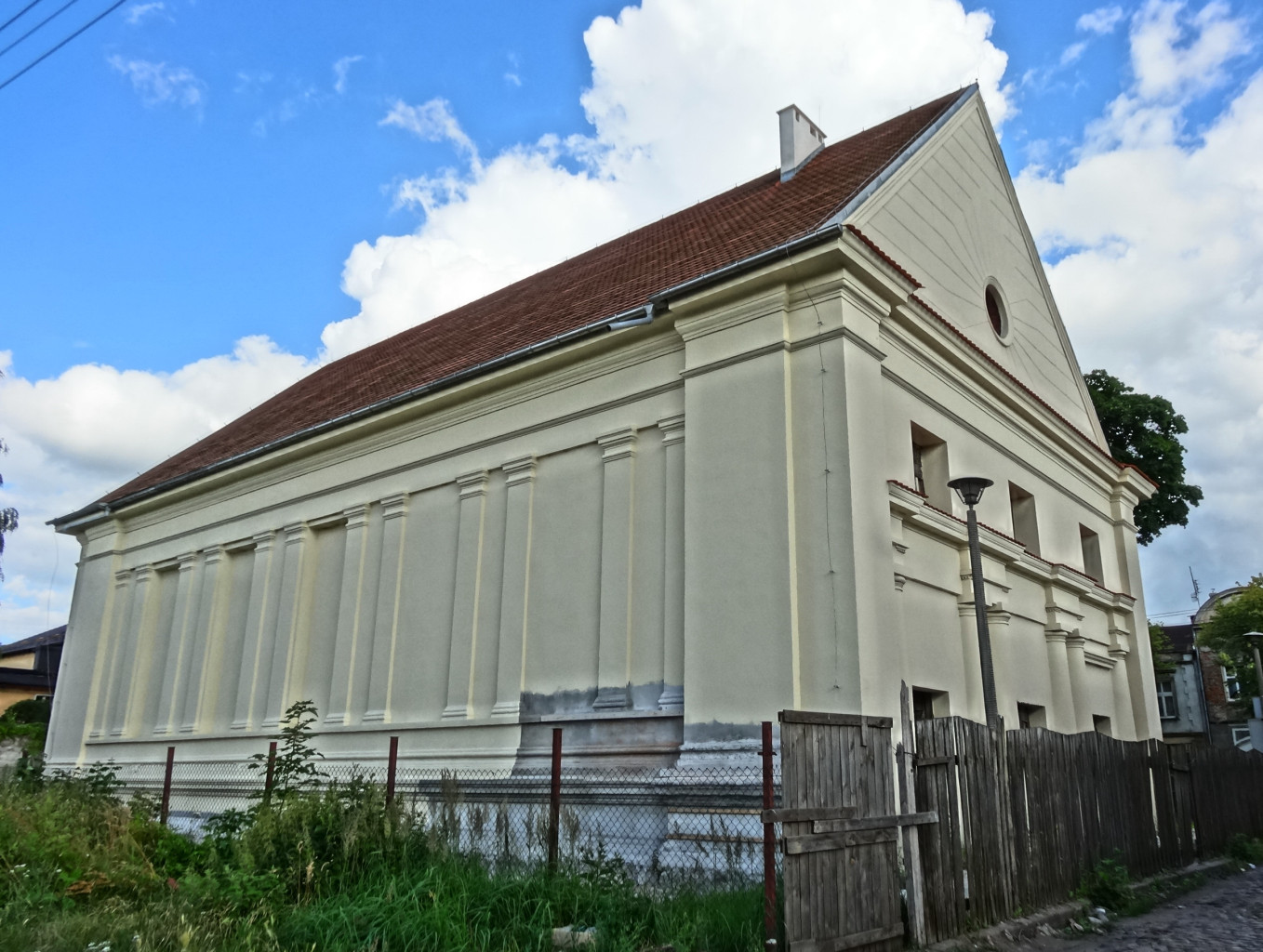
Fordon synagogue in 2013, after first renovations

In 2018, the Fordon synagogue was included in the Gminny Program Rewitalizacji (Municipal Revitalization Program), with the intention to create a cultural and social center for the residents of Old Fordon. The comprehensive revitalization of the building included interior renovation, window restoration, furniture purchasing and landscaping of the building's surroundings.

In 2020, the situation took a dramatic turn: due to the unsettled grant of 600 000 Polish złoty from the Kazimierz Wielki University foundation, the city tax office seized the building and put it up for auction in November.

After the failures of several public auctions, the building is managed since OCtober 2023 by the Fordon Synagogue – Cultural Center Foundation (Fundacji Synagoga – Dom Kultury w Fordonie), which had created a garden in 2024, next to the synagogue. The overall restoration project will be costly and lengthy. It should start with the windows that are still bricked up. The process is naturally coordinated with the Warsaw Rabbinical Commission.

== See also ==
- Bydgoszcz Synagogue
- Fordon, Bydgoszcz
- Bydgoszcz
- Synagogue's interior elements

== Bibliography ==
- Jankowski, Aleksander (2011). Zabytkowa Bóżnica Murowana W Bydgoszczy-Fordonie W Świetle Najnowszych Badań. Kwartalnik Architektury i Urbanistyki z.2 [The Historic Brick Synagogue in Bydgoszcz-Fordon in the Light of the Latest Research. Architecture and Urban Planning Quarterly no. 2] (in Polish). Warszawa: Komitet Architektury i Urbanistyki PAN.
- Kawski, Tomasz (2008). Żydzi w Fordonie. Dzieje. Kultura. Zabytki [Jews in Fordon. History. Culture. Monuments.] (in Polish). Bydgoszcz: Fundacja Kultury YAKIZA.
- Biegański, Zdzisław (1997). Dzieje Fordonu i okolic [History of Fordon and the surrounding area.] (in Polish). Bydgoszcz: Kujawsko-Pomorskie Towarzystwo Kulturalne.
- Sekuła-Tauer, Ewa (1996). Zabytki Fordonu – Synagoga. Materiały do Dziejów Kultury i Sztuki Bydgoszczy i Regionu - Zeszyt 1 [Monuments of Fordon – Synagogue. Materials for the History of Culture and Art of Bydgoszcz and the Region – Issue 1] (in Polish). Bydgoszcz: Kujawsko-Pomorskie Towarzystwo Kulturalne. pp. 57–61.
