= Independence Estate (Bydgoszcz) =

Coordinates: 53.168°N 18.161°E

Independence Estate (Osiedle Niepodległości) is in Bydgoszcz, Poland, and is the youngest district in Fordon. The first block of Wyzwolenia street was made available for use in June 1990.
