= Gądecz =

- Village
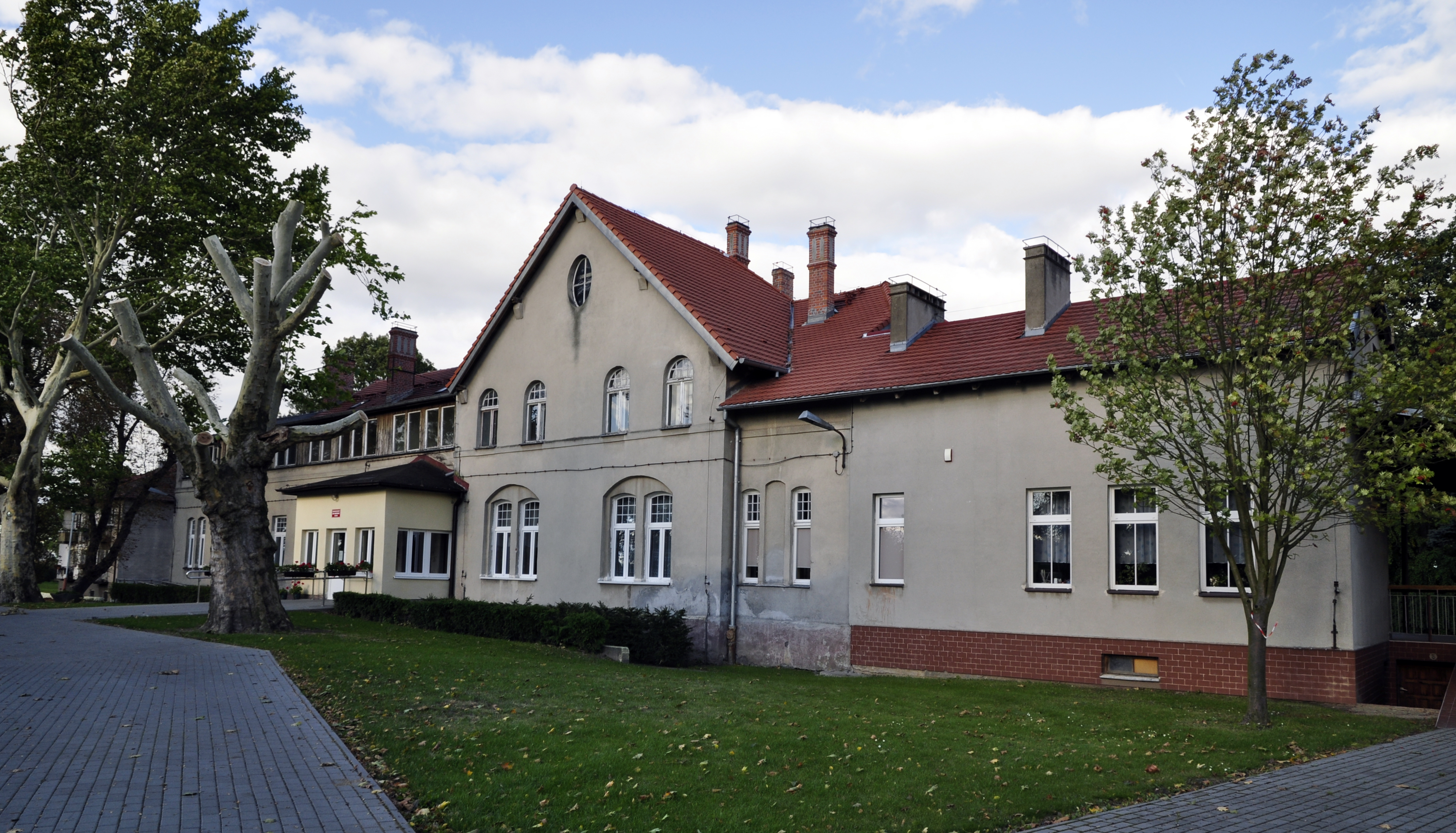
- Manor in Gądecz

- Location within Poland
- Coordinates: 53°13′00″N 18°10′00″E
- Country: Poland
- Voivodeship: Kuyavian-Pomeranian
- County: Bydgoszcz
- Gmina: Dobrcz

Gądecz [ˈɡɔndɛt͡ʂ] is a village in the administrative district of Gmina Dobrcz, within Bydgoszcz County, Kuyavian-Pomeranian Voivodeship, in north-central Poland.
