= Strzelce Górne =

- Village
- Location within Poland
- Coordinates: 53°12′N 18°9′E
- Country: Poland
- Voivodeship: Kuyavian-Pomeranian
- County: Bydgoszcz
- Gmina: Dobrcz

Strzelce Górne [ˈstʂɛlt͡sɛ ˈɡurnɛ] is a village in the administrative district of Gmina Dobrcz, within Bydgoszcz County, Kuyavian-Pomeranian Voivodeship, in north-central Poland.
