= Tatrzańskie (Bydgoszcz district) =

District in Bydgoszcz, Poland

The Tatrzańskie development is part of the Fordon section of Bydgoszcz, Poland, lying on the Vistula river. It has been included in Bydgoszcz since 1 January 1973. Housing development began in the 1980s. There is bus service for the area, including the Tatra Marketplace. Street names are based on subjects associated with the Tatra mountain range.

== Schools ==
- Elementary school nr 9
- Elementary school nr 67
- Junior High nr 2
- School brothers Salesians
