= Czarnówczyn =

- Village
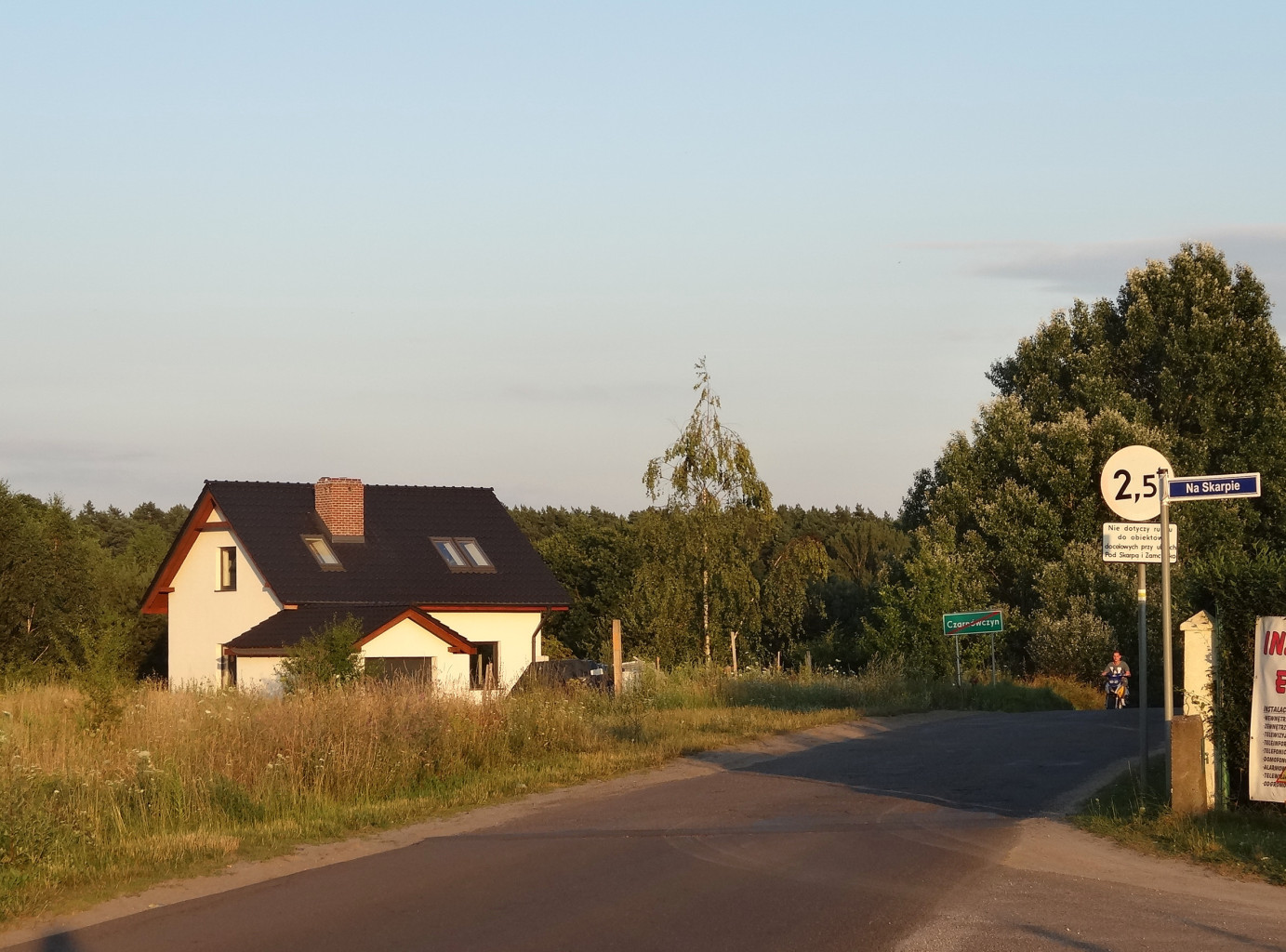
- Houses in Czarnówczyn

- Location within Poland
- Coordinates: 53°10′17″N 18°05′18″E
- Country: Poland
- Voivodeship: Kuyavian-Pomeranian
- County: Bydgoszcz
- Gmina: Osielsko
- Population: 68

Czarnówczyn [t͡ʂarˈnuft͡ʂɨn] is a village in the administrative district of Gmina Osielsko, within Bydgoszcz County, Kuyavian-Pomeranian Voivodeship, in north-central Poland.
