= Jarużyn, Kuyavian-Pomeranian Voivodeship =

Jarużyn
- Village
- Location within Poland
- Coordinates: 53°12′N 18°9′E
- Country: Poland
- Voivodeship: Kuyavian-Pomeranian
- County: Bydgoszcz
- Gmina: Osielsko

Jarużyn [jaˈruʐɨn] is a village in the administrative district of Gmina Osielsko, within Bydgoszcz County, Kuyavian-Pomeranian Voivodeship, in north-central Poland.
