= Fordon, Bydgoszcz =

Fordon
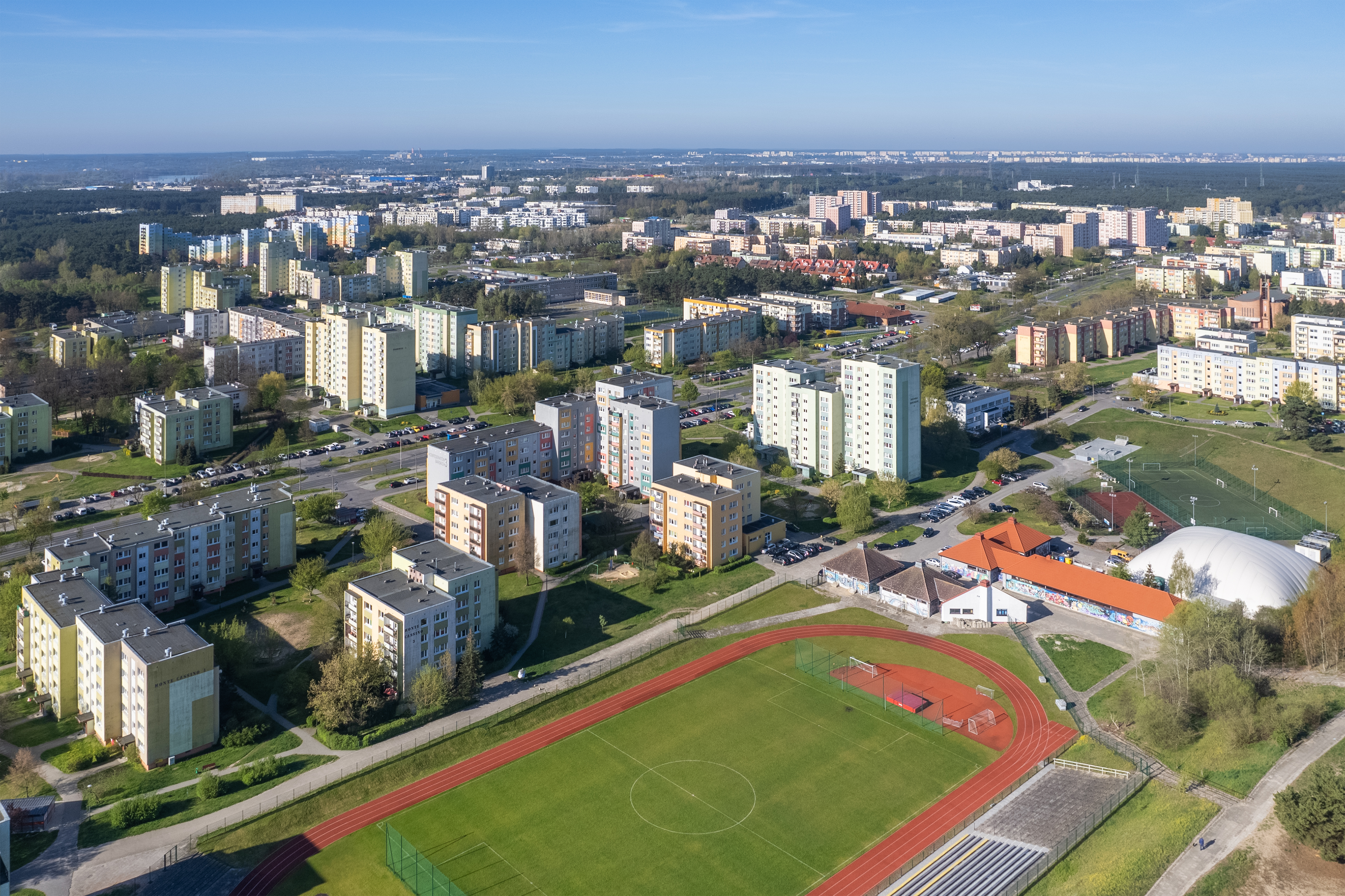
- Panorama of Fordon district

- Coat of arms

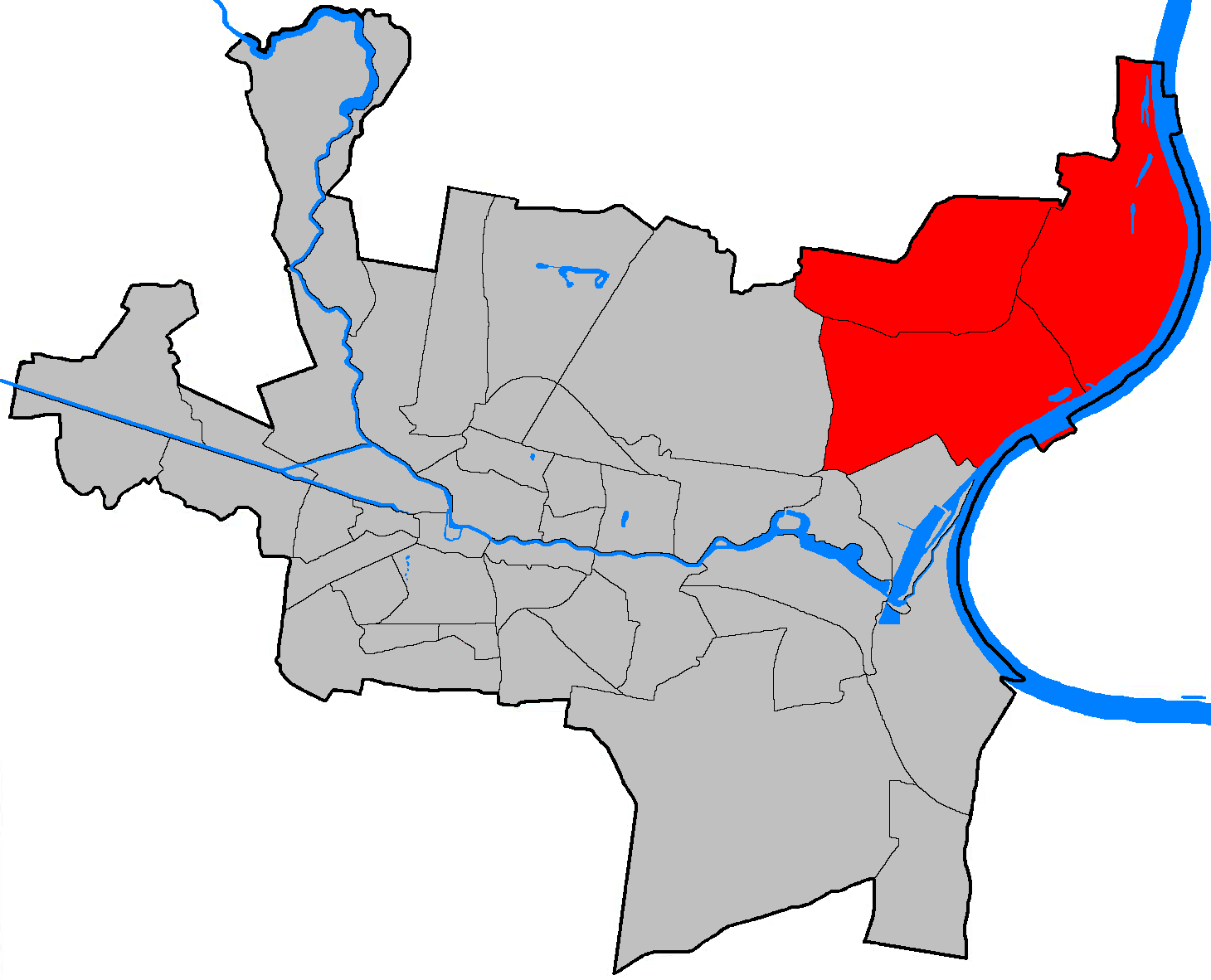
- Location of Fordon within Bydgoszcz
- Coordinates: 53°08′51″N 18°10′04″E
- Country: Poland
- Voivodeship: Kuyavian-Pomeranian
- County/City: Bydgoszcz
- Town rights: 1382
- Within city limits: 1973/1977
- Time zone: UTC+1 (CET)
  - Summer (DST): UTC+2 (CEST)

Fordon, is a district in Bydgoszcz, Poland, located in the north-eastern part of the city, with some 75,000 inhabitants. Currently, Fordon is the biggest district of Bydgoszcz.

== House estates ==
Fordon is subdivided into 16 house estates:

- Stary Fordon
- Akademickie
- Bajka
- Bohaterów
- Eskulapa
- Kasztelanka
- Łoskoń
- Mariampol
- Nad Wisłą
- Niepodległości
- Pałcz
- Powiśle
- Przylesie
- Szybowników
- Tatrzańskie
- Zofin

== History ==
A settlement in place of Fordon is mentioned in sources for the first time in 1112 as Wyszogród. In those times there was located an important defensive castle which was eventually fired and destroyed in 1330 by the Teutonic Knights. Fordon was a royal town of the Kingdom of Poland, administratively located in the Bydgoszcz County in the Inowrocław Voivodeship in the Greater Poland Province.

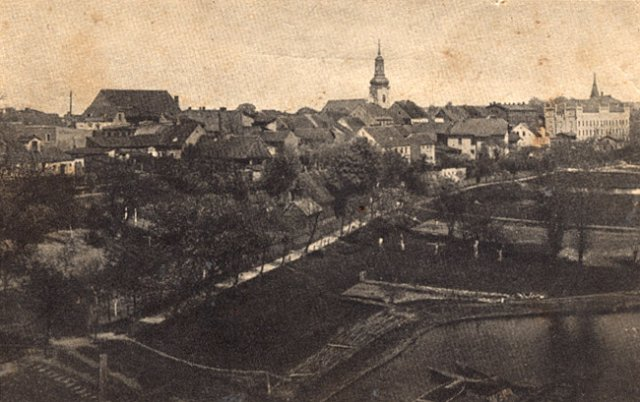
Fordon in the interwar period

In the Partitions of Poland it was annexed by Prussia. In 1807, Fordon was regained by Poles and included in the short-lived Duchy of Warsaw. After the dissolution of the duchy in 1815, it was re-annexed by Prussia, and included within the semi-autonomous Grand Duchy of Posen. It was returned to Poland at the end of the First World War.

Following the German invasion of Poland, which started World War II in September 1939, it was occupied and annexed by Nazi Germany. It is estimated that during the war, German soldiers killed from 1,200 to 3,000 people, mainly Poles and Jews, in a place now known as the Valley of Death. The exact number stays unknown as historians have not found appropriate documents that would state the final number of deaths. In 1945 Fordon was liberated from German occupation.

In 1950 Fordon was still a separate town from Bydgoszcz. At that time it was described as "seven miles east" of the latter city. It had a population of 3,514 people and manufactured such things as cement and paper. In 1973 Fordon became a part of the city of Bydgoszcz.

The prison in Fordon was established in 1780 and changed into a men's/women's prison several times. From 1939-1956 among others, there were kept and killed 180 Ukrainian women in the prison. A memorial plaque was placed on the prison on May 10, 1992.

== Buildings and places ==
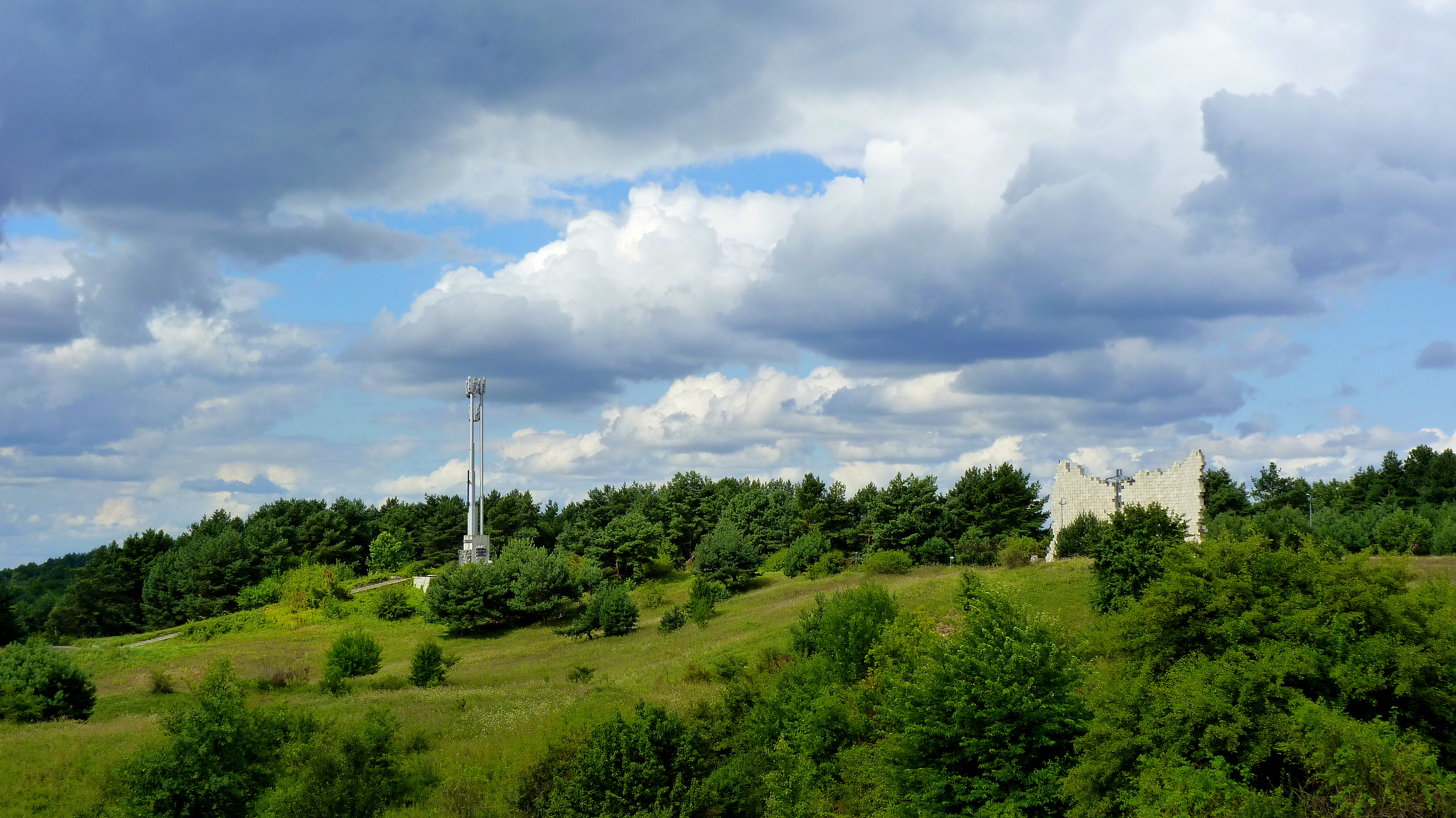
Memorials at the Valley of Death

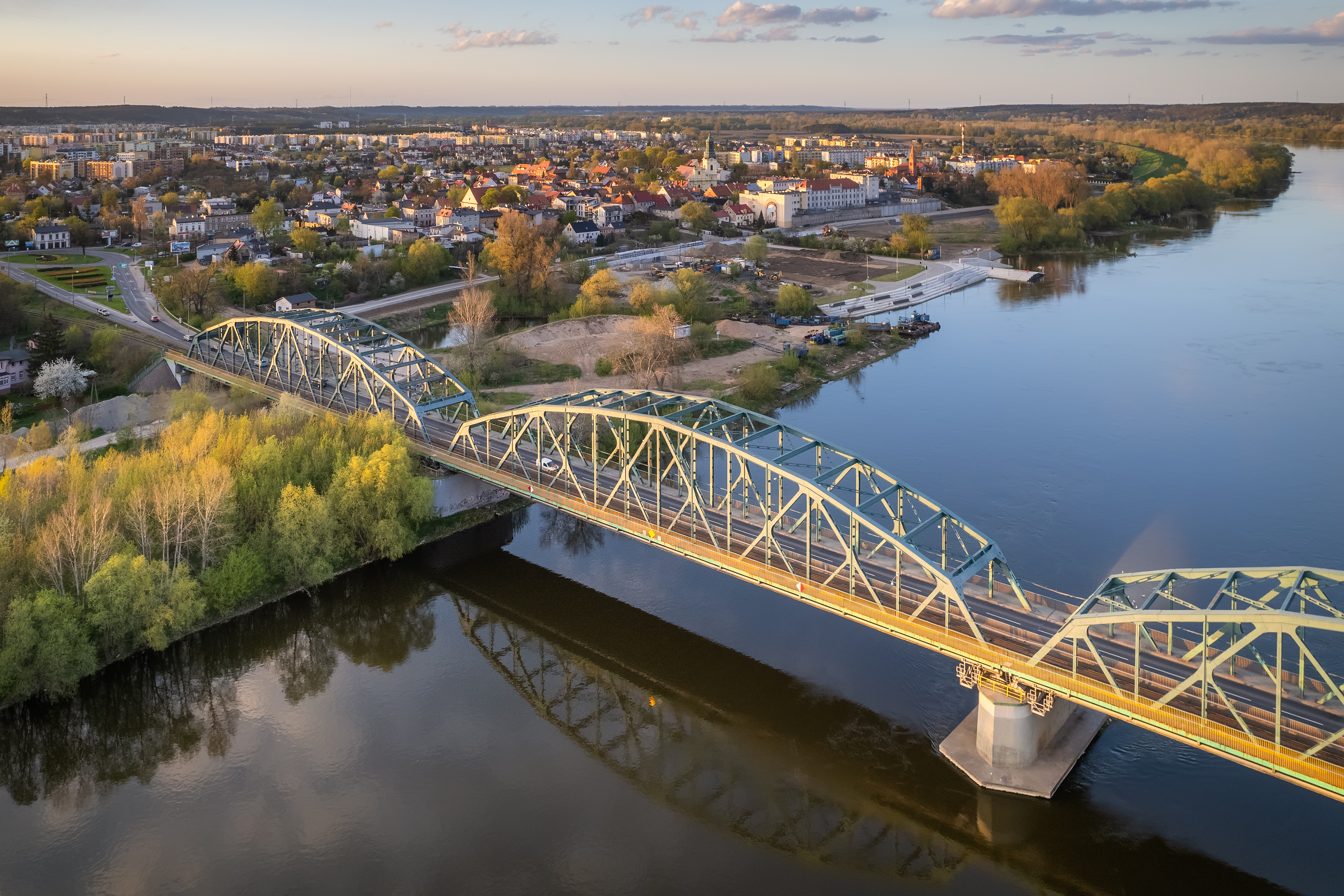
Fordon Bridge

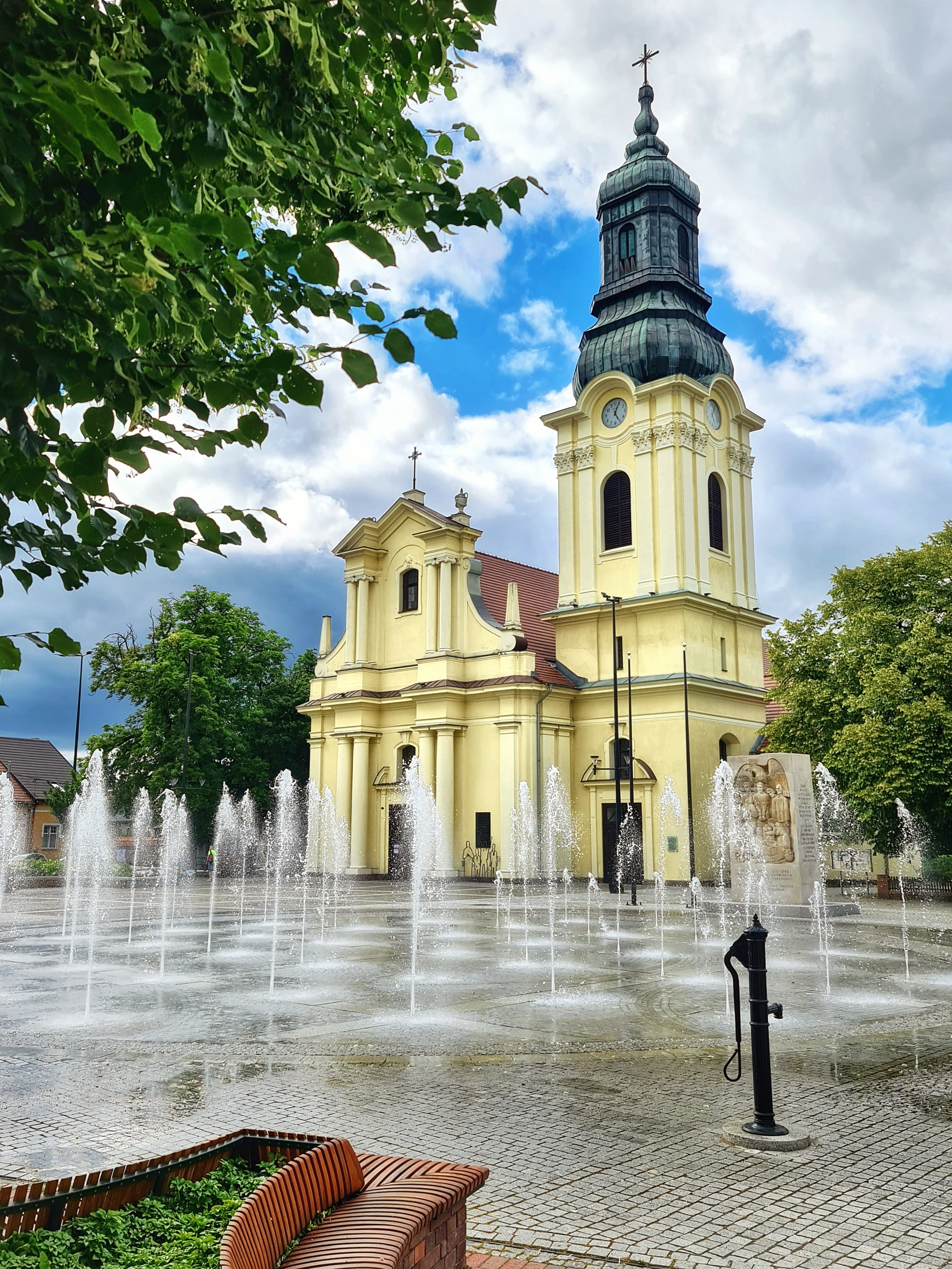
Baroque Saint Nicholas church

- Valley of Death
- Baroque Saint Nicholas church
- Gothic Revival Saint John the Evangelist church
- Fordon Bridge
- Centre of Oncology (Hospital)
- Synagogue from 18th century
- Prison
- Millennium Park

== Education ==
Universities

- Wyższa Szkoła Informatyki - Ulica Fordońska 246
- Wyższa Szkoła Informatyki i Przedsiębiorczości w Bydgoszczy - Ulica Unii Lubelskiej
- Uniwersytet Kazimierza Wielkiego - Ulica Przemysłowa 34
- Politechnika Bydgoska im. Jana i Jędzrzeja Śniadeckich - Ulica Kaliskiego 7

High Schools

- Liceum Ogólnokształcące nr XIII (Zespoł Szkół nr 3) - Ulica Łowicka 45
- Liceum Ogólnokształcące nr XV (Zespoł Szkół nr 5) - Ulica Berlinga 13
- Liceum Ogólnokształcące nr XVI (Zespół Szkół Odzieżowych) - Ulica Fordońska 430
- Liceum Ogólnokształcące Towarzystwa Salezjańskiego - Ulica Pod Reglami 1

Primary Schools

- Primary School nr 27 - Ulica Sielska 34
- Primary School nr 29 - Ulica Gawedy 5
- Primary School nr 4 - Ulica Wyzwolenia 4
- Primary School nr 43 - Ulica Łowicka 45
- Primary School 65 (filia) - Ulica Rzeźniackiego 7
- Primary School 65 - Ulica Duracza 7
- Primary School nr 66 - Ulica Berlinga 3
- Primary School nr 67 - Ulica Kromera 11
- Primary School nr 9 - Ulica Tatrzanska 21
- Szkoła Podstawowa Towarzystwa Salezjańskiego - Ulica Salezjańska 1

== Sources ==
"Kujawsko-pomorskie dla każdego. Przewodnik turystyczny po najciekawszych miejscach województwa" Włodzimierz Bykowski, Wieńczysław Bykowski, wyd. Apeiron ISBN 83-919091-1-5 & Towarzystwo Przyjaciół Dolnej Wisły ISBN 83-919299-5-7, Bydgoszcz 2005 My Odyssey "Моя Одисея" Irena Tymoszko-Kaminska, Chicago 2005 page 286, ISBN 83-86112-21-2, Oficyna Wydawnicza UKAR 02-588 Warszawa 48, skr.poczt.156
