= Grunwaldzka Street, Bydgoszcz =

Street in Bydgoszcz, Poland

Coordinates: 53°08′29″N 17°56′29″E

Grunwaldzka street
Bydgoszcz
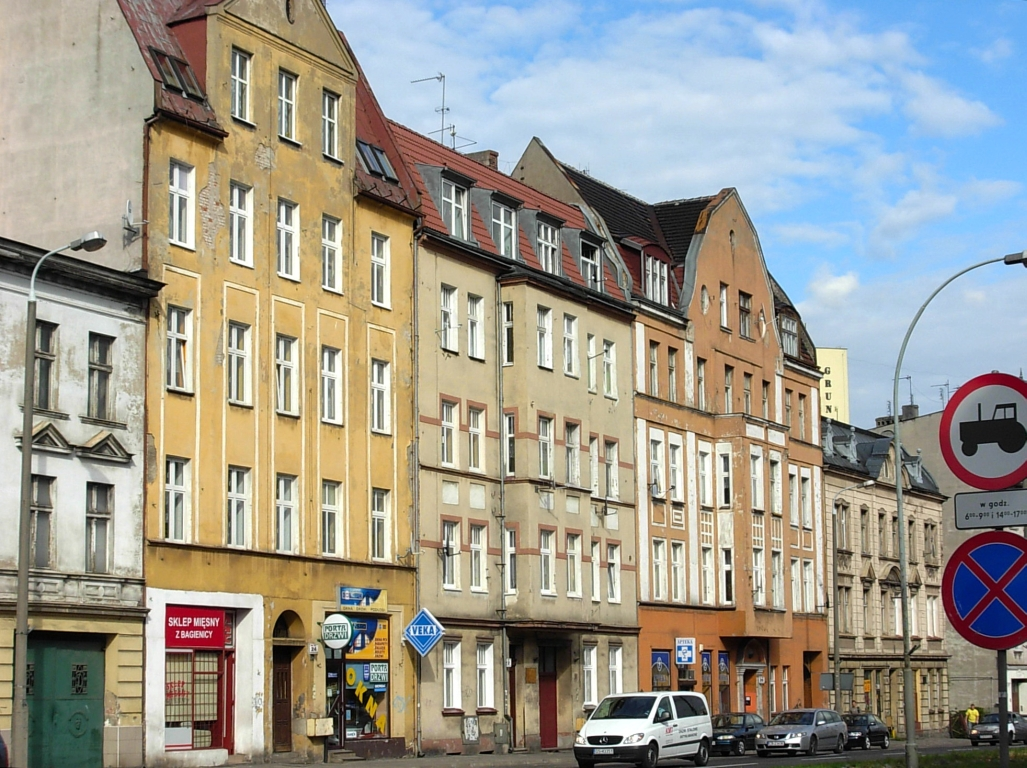
- View of historic facades on Grunwaldzka street

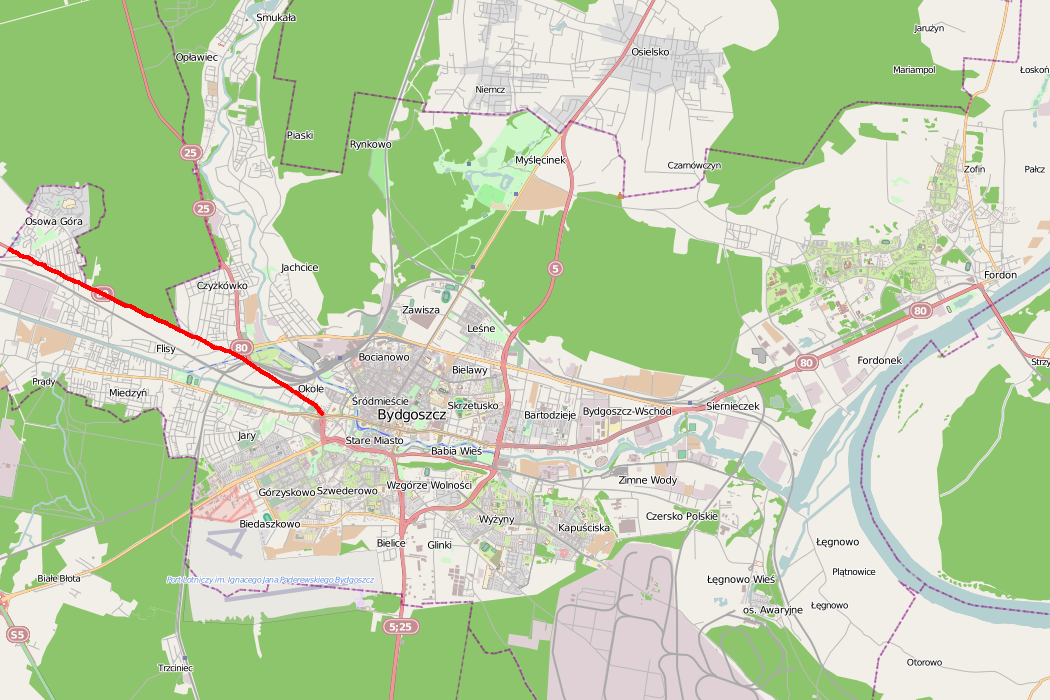
- Grunwaldzka Street highlighted on a Bydgoszcz map
- Native name: Ulica Grunwaldzka w Bydgoszczy (Polish)
- Former names: Berliner Straße, Lindenstraße, Chausseestraße
- Namesake: Battle of Grunwald
- Owner: City of Bydgoszcz
- Length: 6,700 m (22,000 ft)-Google maps
- Width: ca. 20m
- Area: Downtown (Polish: Śródmieście), Okole, Osowa Góra districts
- Location: Bydgoszcz, Poland

Construction
- Construction start: Early 1850s

Grunwaldzka street, laid in the 1850s, is an extended axis in Bydgoszcz, Poland. Many frontages on this street offer architectural interests: some of the buildings are registered on the Kuyavian-Pomeranian Voivodeship Heritage List.

== Location ==
The street runs on a west north-west axis, leading to Nakło nad Notecią (towards Piła and Szczecin). It connects Bydgoszcz downtown district to western city areas (i.e. Okole, Czyżkówko, Flisy, Osowa Góra). Polish national road Nr.80 runs along the street located north of Bydgoszcz Canal and Polish national road Nr.25 south of the canal. It is one of the longest and busiest axis of Bydgoszcz.

== History ==
Grunwaldzka street is mentioned on an 1855 address book of Bromberg, but appears as early as 1827 as a path to Nakło nad Notecią. On an 1857 map, then on an 1876 city map the axis is mentioned as a Berliner Chaussee or Highway to Berlin. At that time, it appears as an extension of the Berliner Straße (today's Swiętej Trojcy street) to the west. In 1851, the railway from Berlin to Kaliningrad -via Bromberg- was built along that path. In 1895, a narrow-gauge railway track from Bydgoszcz to Koronowo was laid, with a station on Grunwaldzka street, Bydgoszcz Wąskotorowa, linked to the city tram network in 1898. The railway did not survive WWII and is now operated for touristic purposes between two villages west of Nakło: railtracks on Grunwaldzka were pulled part in 1969. The tramway line in the street was dismantled in 1984.

Because of its exceptional length, the avenue, originating from Bromberg, crossed several other suburban villages which eventually (1960s) were incorporated into Bydgoszcz territory. As a consequence, the street in its entirety bore many different names associated with conflicting house numbering.

In 2019–2020, municipal authorities launched an extensive rebuilding of the avenue, so as to enlarge it to a dual carriageway with two lanes along most of its length.

There are two railway viaducts along the street:

- The first on the way out of the city center dates back to the 1970s and eases the crossing by the Bydgoszcz - Piła railway line;
- The second supports the railway lines from Bydgoszcz to Inowrocław, which was completed in 2014 to replace the initial bridge from 1872.

Through history, this street bore the following names:

- From inception in the 1850s to 1902,
  - Berliner Straße and Berliner chausseee (Bydgoszcz territory);
  - Lindenstraße (Schleusenau area);
  - Chaussestraße (Okolo area).
- 1903–1920,
  - Berliner Straße on Bydgoszcz soil;
  - Chausseestraße (nach Nakel) (Route to Nachel) on Schleusenau area.
- 1920–1939, Ulica Grunwaldzka;
- 1939–1945, Berliner Straße;
- Since 1945, Ulica Grunwaldzka.

Current name refers to the Battle of Grunwald (July 15, 1410), part of the Polish–Lithuanian–Teutonic War, where the alliance of the Kingdom of Poland and the Grand Duchy of Lithuania, defeated Teutonic Order, led by Grand Master Ulrich von Jungingen.

== Main areas and edifices ==
Grunwaldzka stems out of a large city roundabout (Polish: Rondo Grunwaldzkie) where it connects with Focha, Nakielska and Kruszwicka streets.

=== Tenement at 1/3 ===
Built in 1910, by Theodor Patzwald

Early modernism

The first owners of the tenement were the Goltz brothers (Gustaw, Rudolf and Oskar) who, as construction managers, conducted many projects in the city. In July 1912, a restaurant and a cafe -Parkhaus- were arranged, with an area as a summer garden: at that time, the place was giving onto the Bydgoszcz Canal, which was covered only in the 1970s. The same year, the Goltz brothers sold the ensemble to C.A. Franke, a successful local entrepreneur. In that period, the building housed the office of the then Royal School of Arts and Crafts, as well as the house designer, architect Theodor Patzwald.

Later on, during the interwar period, the landlord was August Latte, owner of a cheese warehouse and a factory. During the recent renovation of the ensemble in 2015, a mural was created on the wall deprived of opening: it displays advertising with old-fashioned features from the 1920s.

The early modernist style still keeps influence from Art Nouveau: curved bow windows, a broken segmental pediment, a vegetal motif and two grand loggias adorned with slender columns and wrought iron grillwork.

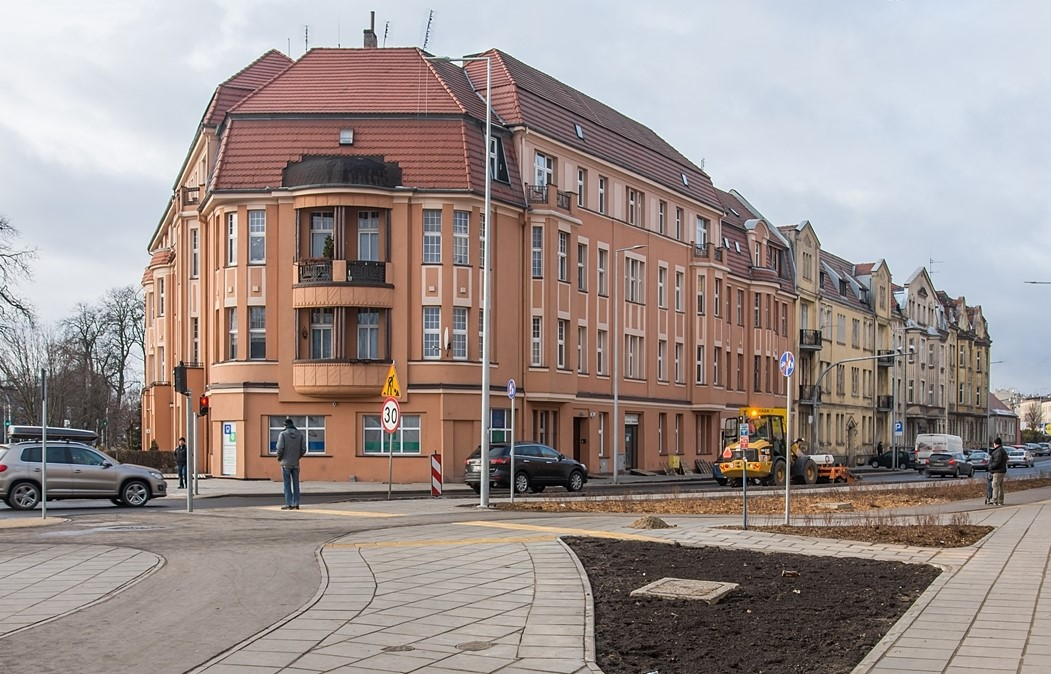
View of the ensemble at 1/3

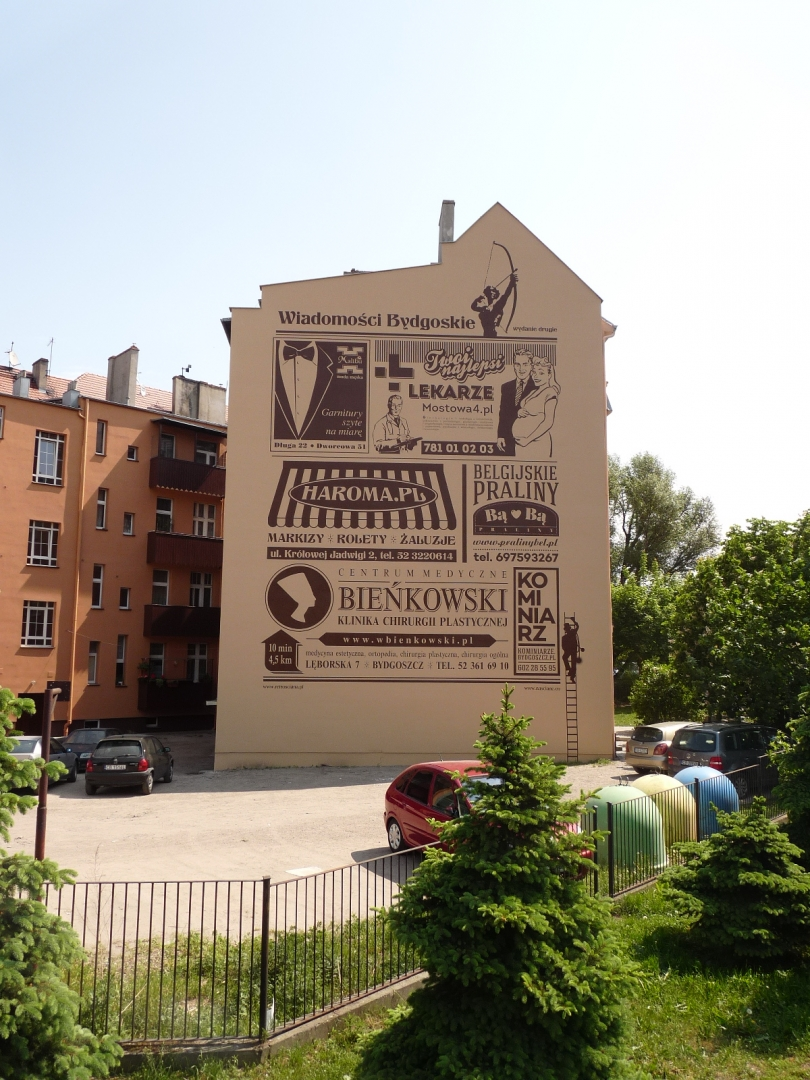
Old-fashion style advert mural

=== Tenement at 2 ===
1880s

Eclecticism

Early in the 1880s, a restaurant was run there by Reinhard Zindler. In the 1920s, another restaurant stood there, with a cafe, called Dom Parkowy, run by Teodor Sikorski.

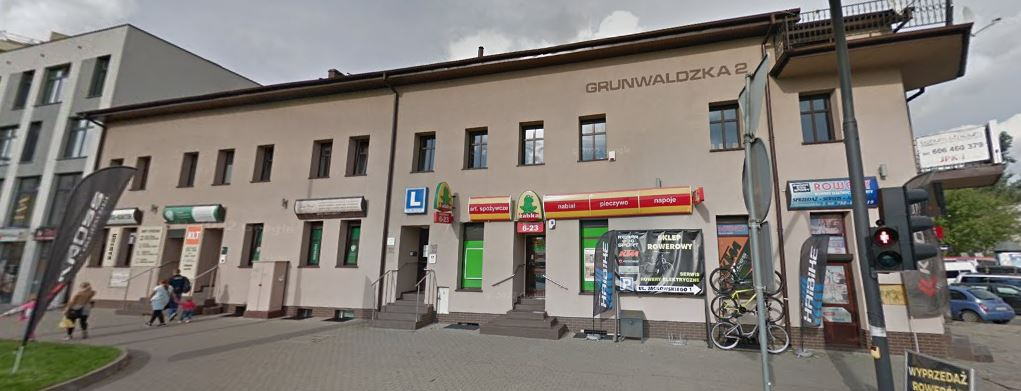
Main elevation

=== Tenement at 5 ===
1910, by Gustaw Otto

Early Modern architecture

After its completion, the building, then at 12c Berliner Straße, was owned by the family Michelschen. The facades were given a traditional, symmetrical arrangement, which, however, testifies to the influence of modernist architecture. One can still notice some festoons on lintels and cartouches and a nicely adorned portal.

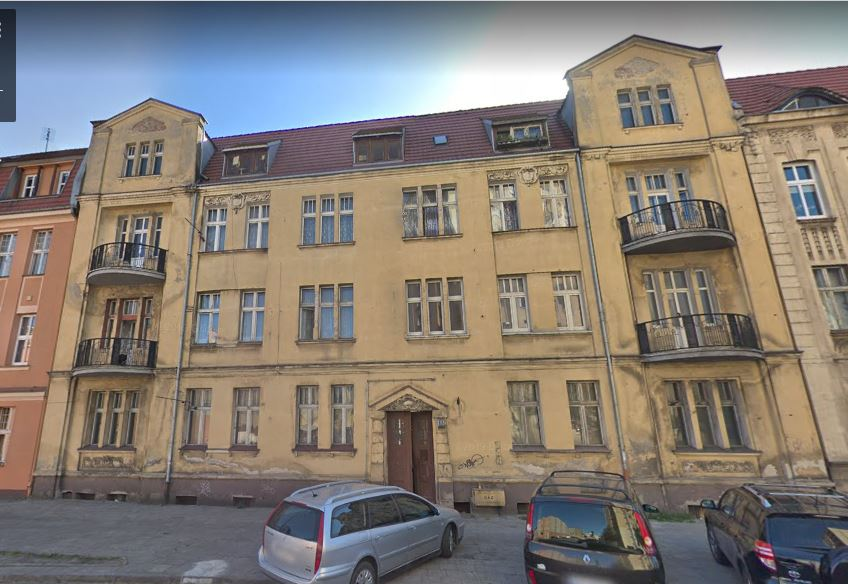
Facade on the street

=== Tenement at 6 ===
1906

Late Art Nouveau

The initial address of the building was 19 Berliner Straße. First register landlord was Gustav Templin, a tradesman.

Although the frontage lost its architectural decoration, one can still appreciate the large canted bay window overlooking the entrance, with a floral motif at its base.

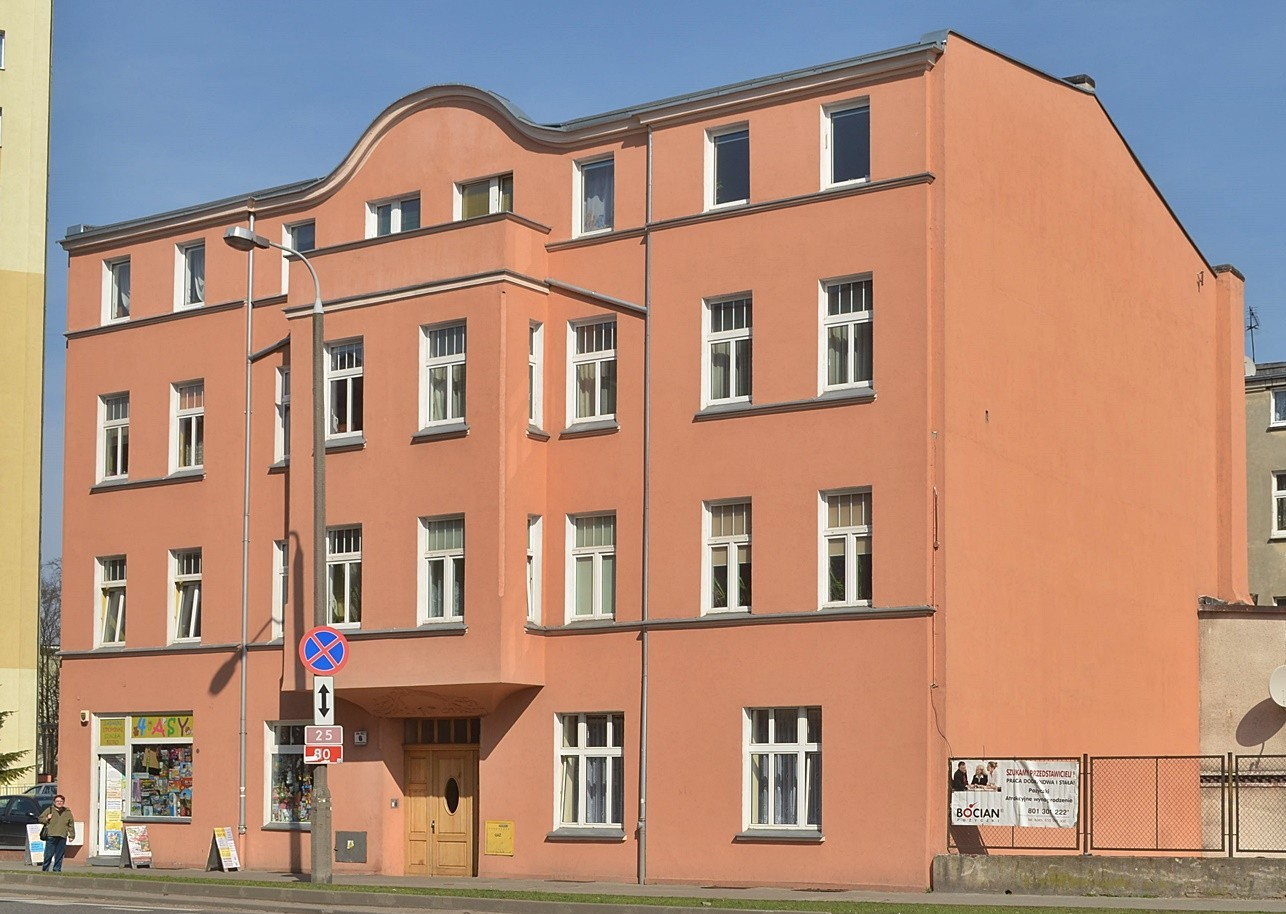
Facade onto the street

=== Tenement at 7 ===
Early 1910s, by Friedrich Lork

Late Art Nouveau

The initial address was 12b Berliner Straße, the first owner being Hermann Wollschläger, a road inspector.

The facade displays delicate Art Nouveau decoration, influenced by early modernism style: canted bay windows with a multitude of architectural motifs as well as an adorned portal or an eyelid dormer.

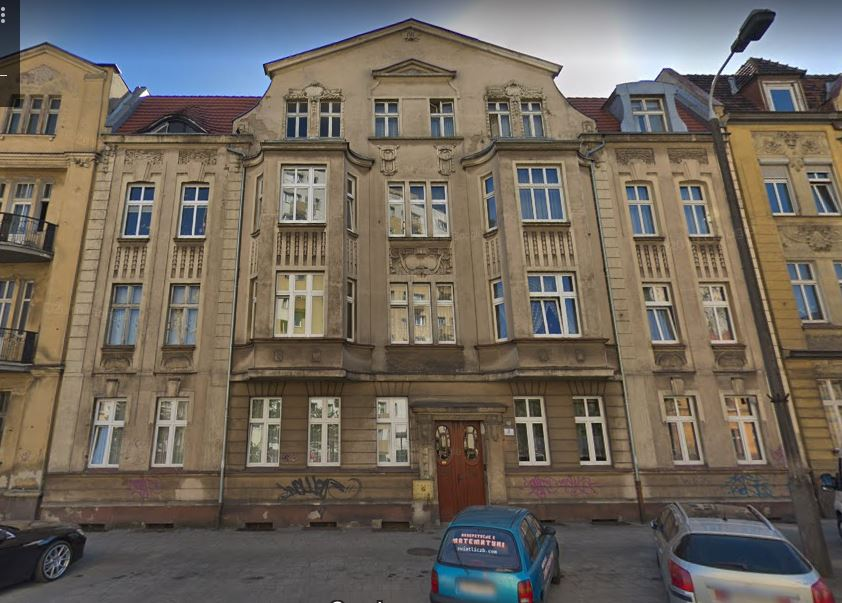
Main frontage

=== Tenement at 9 ===
Late 1900s

Art Nouveau

The tenement, at the time at 12a Berliner Straße, was owned by Gustav Schmidt, a rentier. He commissioned in particular a master bricklayer, Oskar Goltz (owner of house at No 1 at the time). The building calculations and design were probably made by Max Koernig.

Mirroring the abuting building at Nr.7, the frontage at Nr.9 provides an explosion of Art Nouveau details: on the facade, on bay windows or on twin top wall gables, using garnished cartouches, lintels and floral patterns.

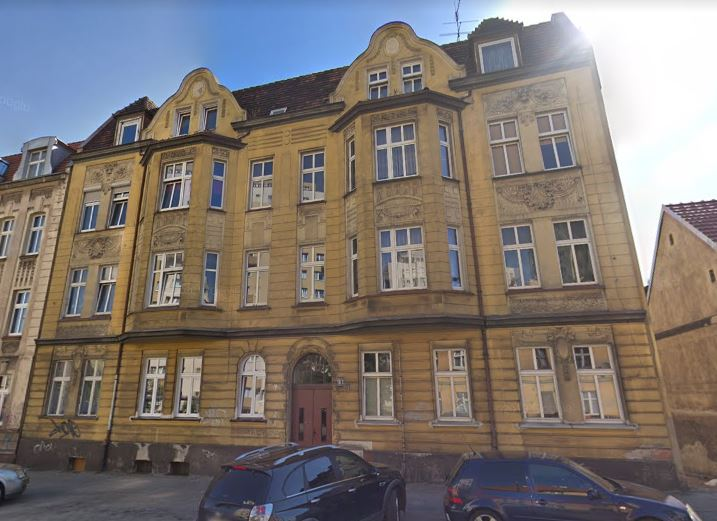
Facade from the street

=== Tenement at 14 ===
1900s

Late Art Nouveau

Located at first at 17 Berliner Straße, the landlord at its construction was Stanislaus Bonneberger, a shoemaker.

The frontage has lost many of its architectural details, but still exhibits late Art Nouveau style mixed with modernist influences. Noticeable are the wrought iron balconies, a few adorned cartouches and the decorated entrance lintel.

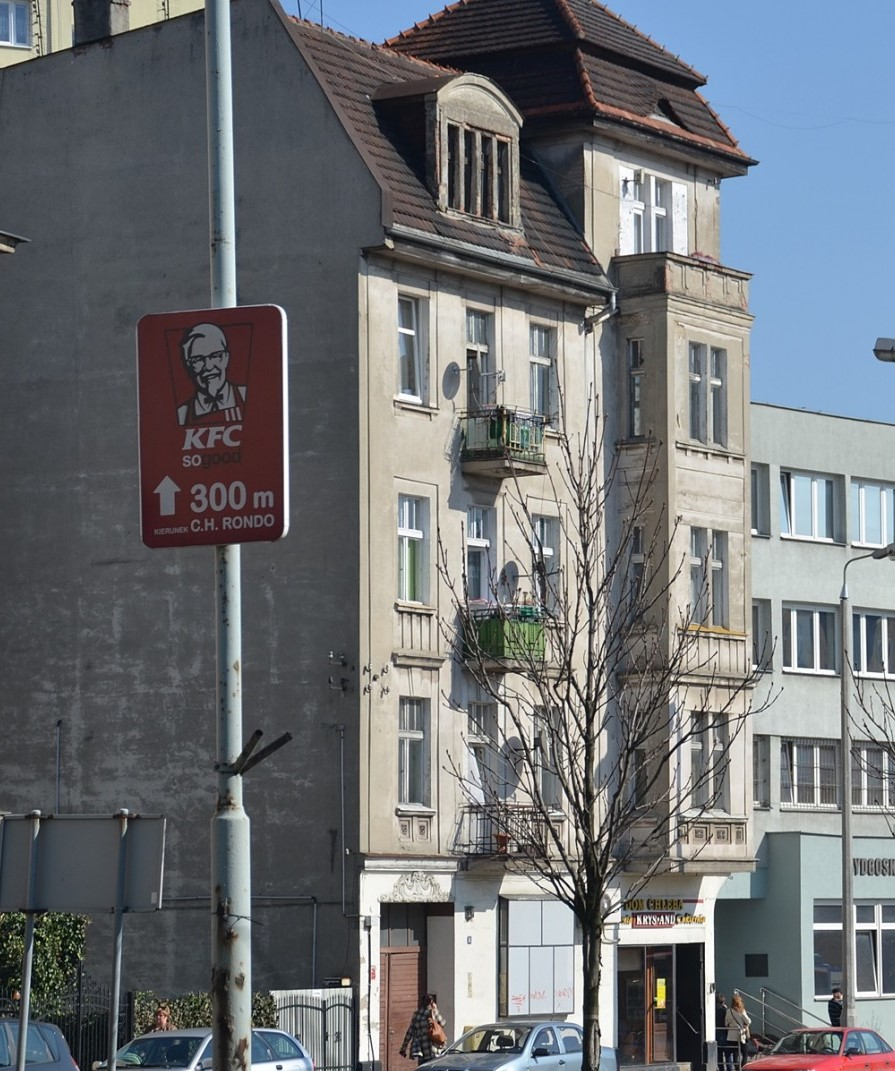
Building at Grunwaldzka 14

=== Starofarny Cemetery at 15 ===
In December 1808, the city hall of Bromberg bought 1 ha of land next to the road leading to Szyszkówka (today's Czyżkówko district), to establish a catholic cemetery: first burials were only performed in 1811, when Prussian authorities banned burying the dead in church cemeteries. Starofarny Cemetery was the first catholic cemetery in the city for which the access road (today's Grunwaldzka street) was cobbled in 1828. In 1855, the cemetery was enlarged by 0.40 ha through purchasing an abuting plot; with several other acquisitions the burial ground reached an area of 1,425 ha. The area entered the city limits in 1877, when Okolo district merged with Bydgoszcz territory. During the second half of the 19th century, the cemetery was embellished: in 1886, a new stone fencing was erected and in 1892, tree avenues were created with chestnuts, maples and lime trees. Since Prussian authorities did not allow the creation of additional catholic parishes during the end of the 19th century, Starofarny cemetery soon got packed: in 1906, eventually, a new parish cemetery was established in the northern suburb of the city, called Cmentarz Nowofarny (English: New parish cemetery), to distinguish it from the Cmentarz Starofarny (English: Old parish cemetery).

During the Nazi occupation, Starofarny cemetery was repeatedly damaged so as to wipe out Polish traces within the city. Following an order from occupying authorities to remove Polish inscriptions from the tombstones, Hitler Youth militias destroyed Polish tombstones, beating inscriptions and damaging the fence. In particular, on a Sunday of April 1942, SA and SS troops stormed the cemetery, smearing Polish gravestones with cement and destroying metal elements of the graves.

Between 1945 and 1964, burials were carried out anew in family graves and in neglected places from the 19th century, which were no more tended. Finally, the last burial took place on July 11, 1964. The cemetery was then declared closed on July 15, 1964, by Bydgoszcz authorities and renamed Municipal cemetery. In the late 1970s, urbanization plans regarding the area where Focha, Kruszwicka, Nakielska and Grunwaldzka streets meet imposed to bulldoze a northern strip of the cemetery. Work started in 1978: it included reconstructing the fence, razing chapels and exhumating some graves. The operation was badly carried out and several errors led to the destruction of a 17th-century chapel, the loss of many family crypts -some of them being work of art edifices- and the demolition of the caretaker's house. The wrought iron grating elements of the main entry gate were returned to the church of the Poor Clares where it originated from.

Those misbehaviours triggered the establishment of a Social Committee for the Rescue of Starofarny Cemetery Monuments, headed by architect Stefan Klajbor, which succeeded in listing the cemetery on the Kuyavian-Pomeranian Voivodeship Heritage List (Nr.601242 A/879, June 28, 1983). In 1985, Metropolitan Curia in Gniezno handed over the management of Starofarny Cmentarz to Bydgoszcz administrative authorities. In 1991, a restoration plan of the facility was launched, comprising, among others:

- a reconstruction of the fence;
- tending the corner of 1870 French soldier tombs;
- rebuilding the 17th century chapel.

Since 1998, the work has been supported by private funds collected locally during All Saints' Day. In 2018, further contributions also made possible additional renovations such as fencing and family chapels. In 1994, city authorities reopened the cemetery for burials, especially for local distinguished people.

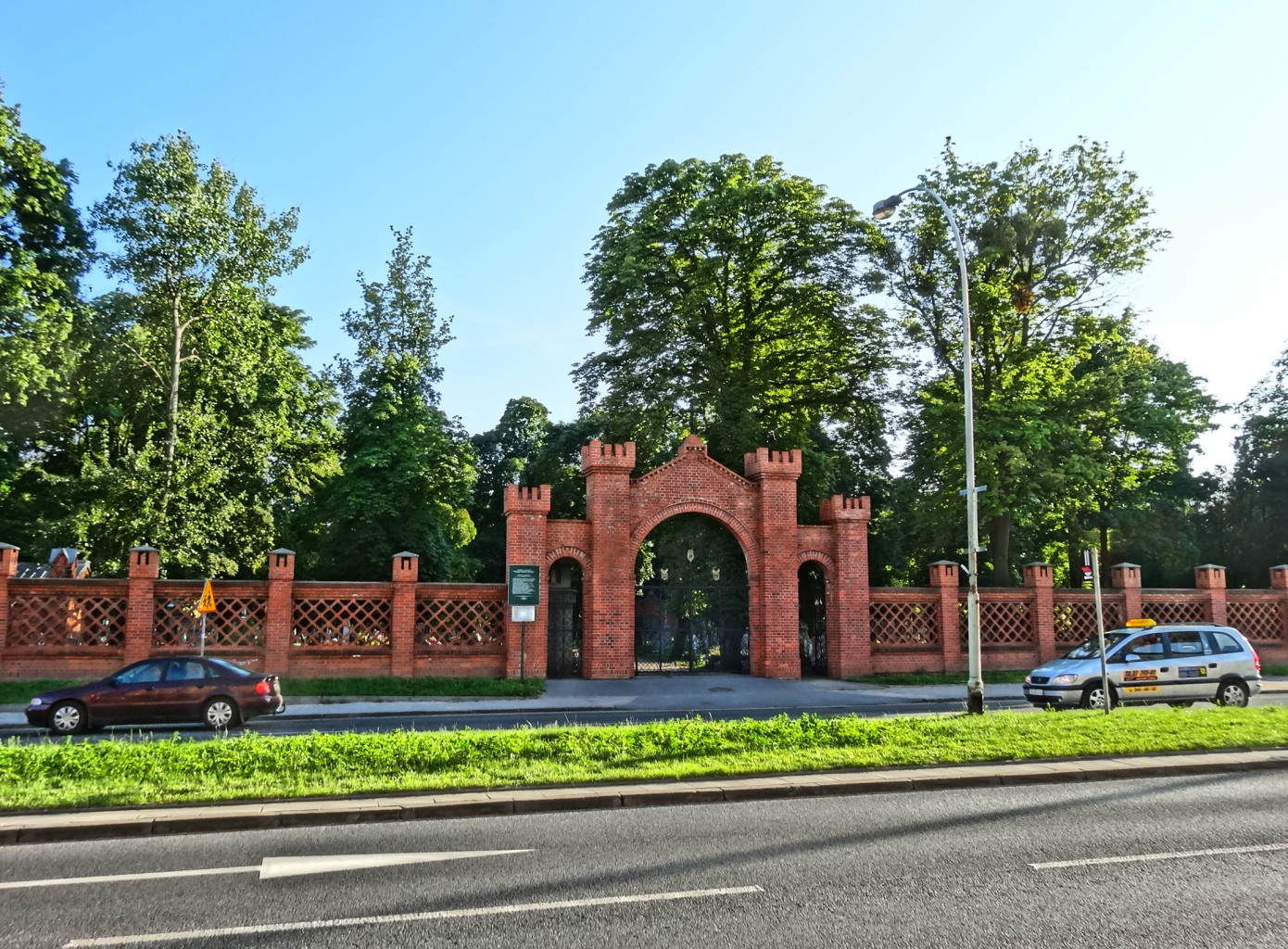
Fence

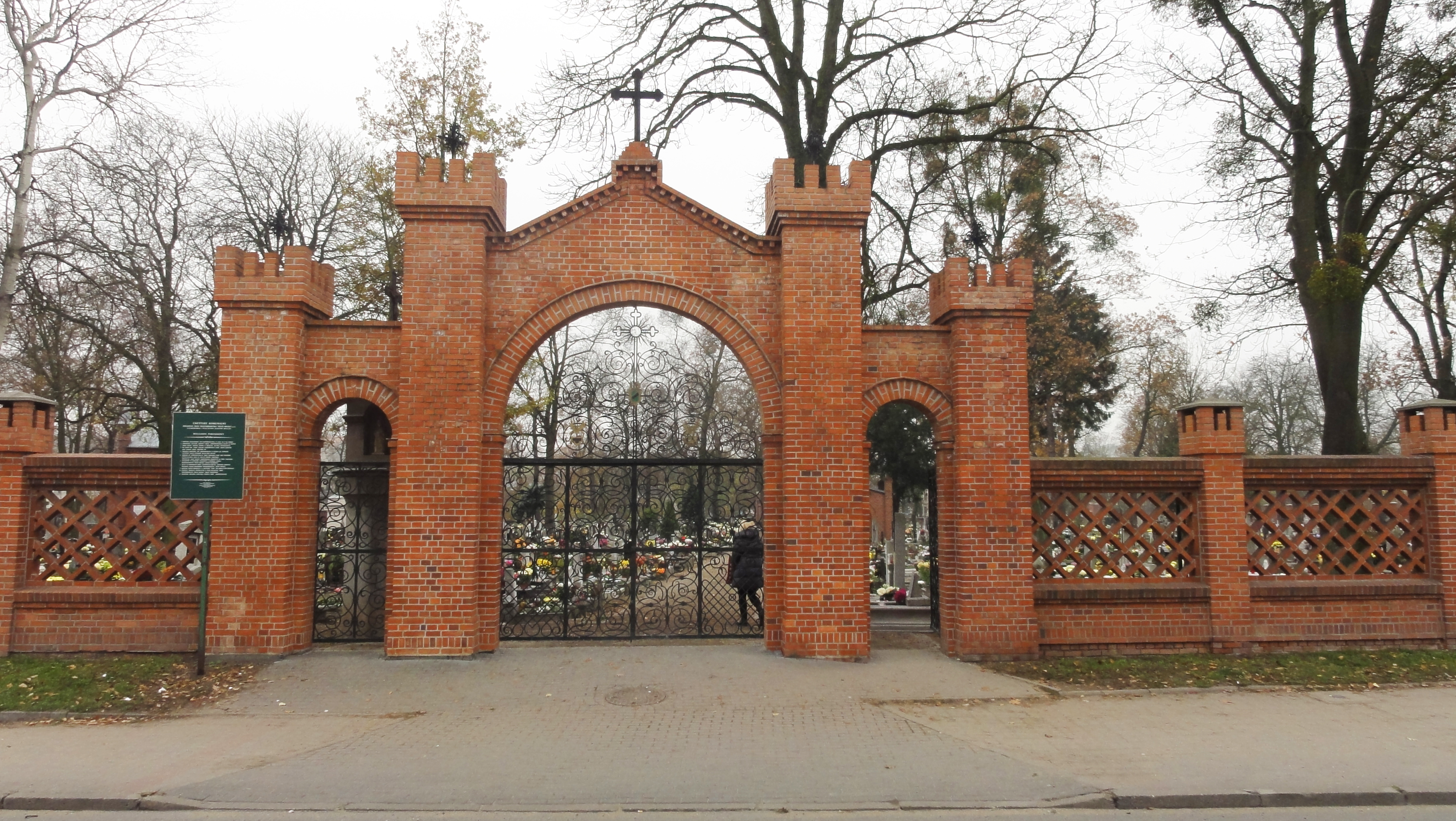
Main entry gate onto Grunwaldzka street

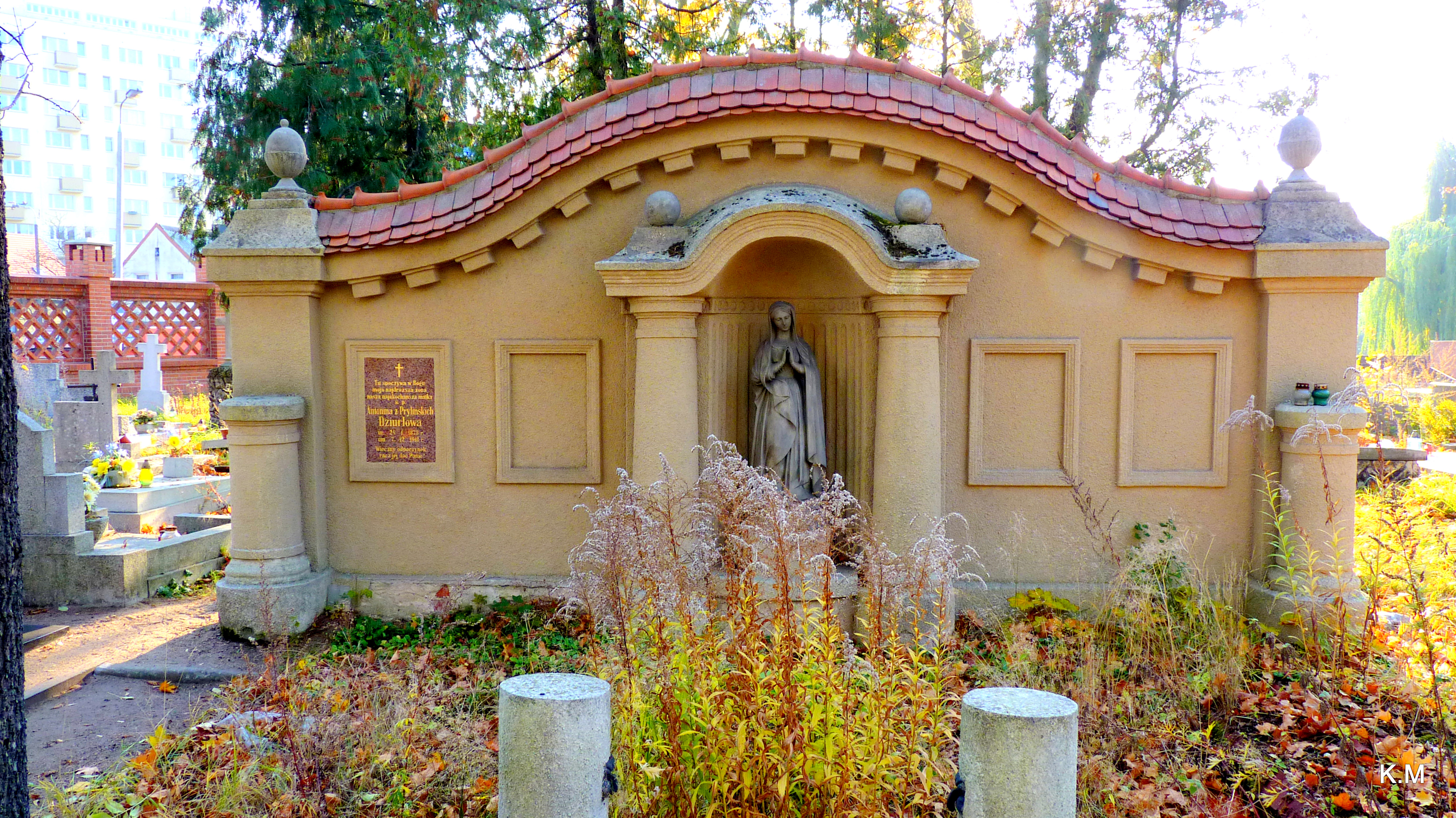
Tomb monument

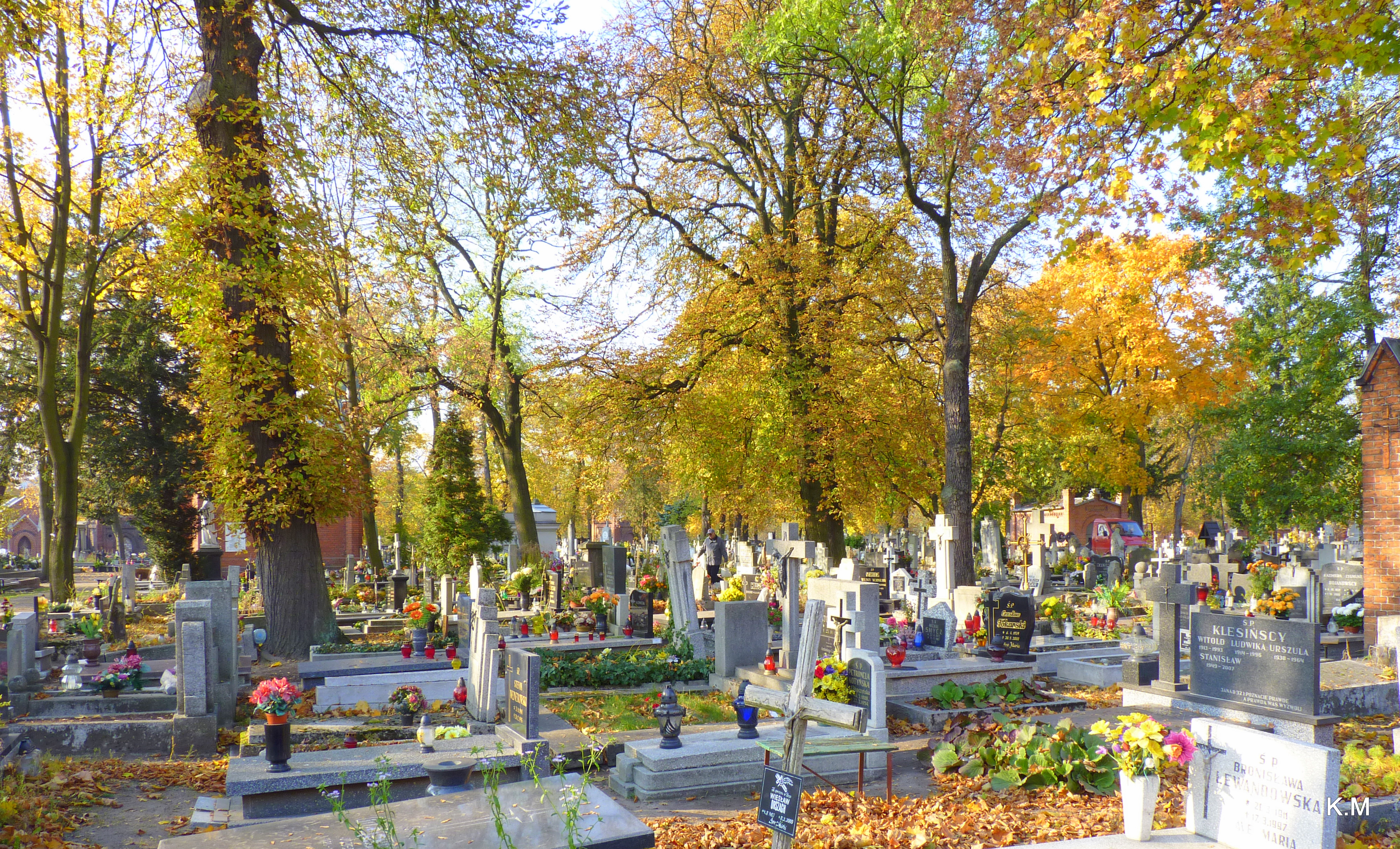
General view

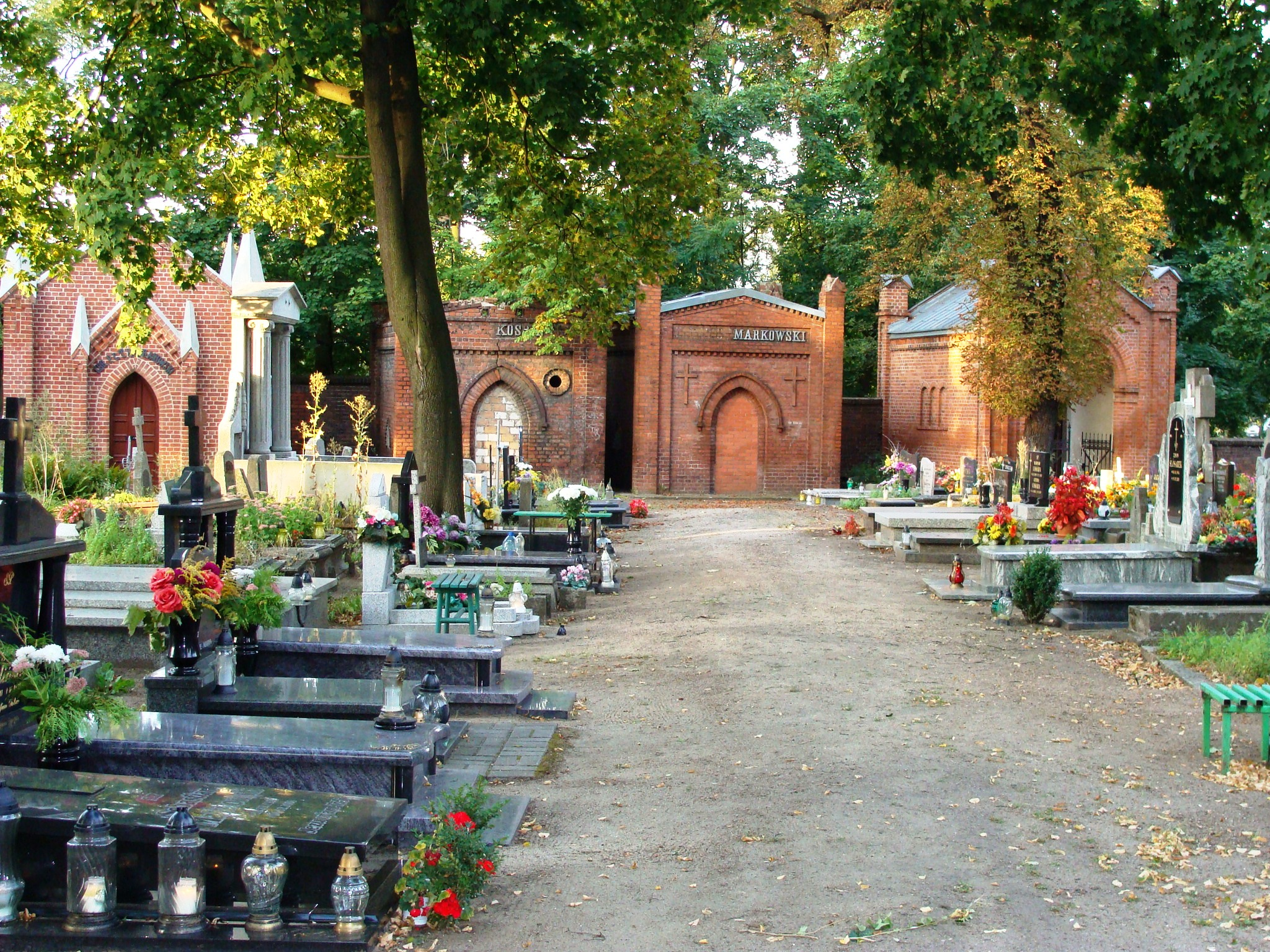
Family chapels

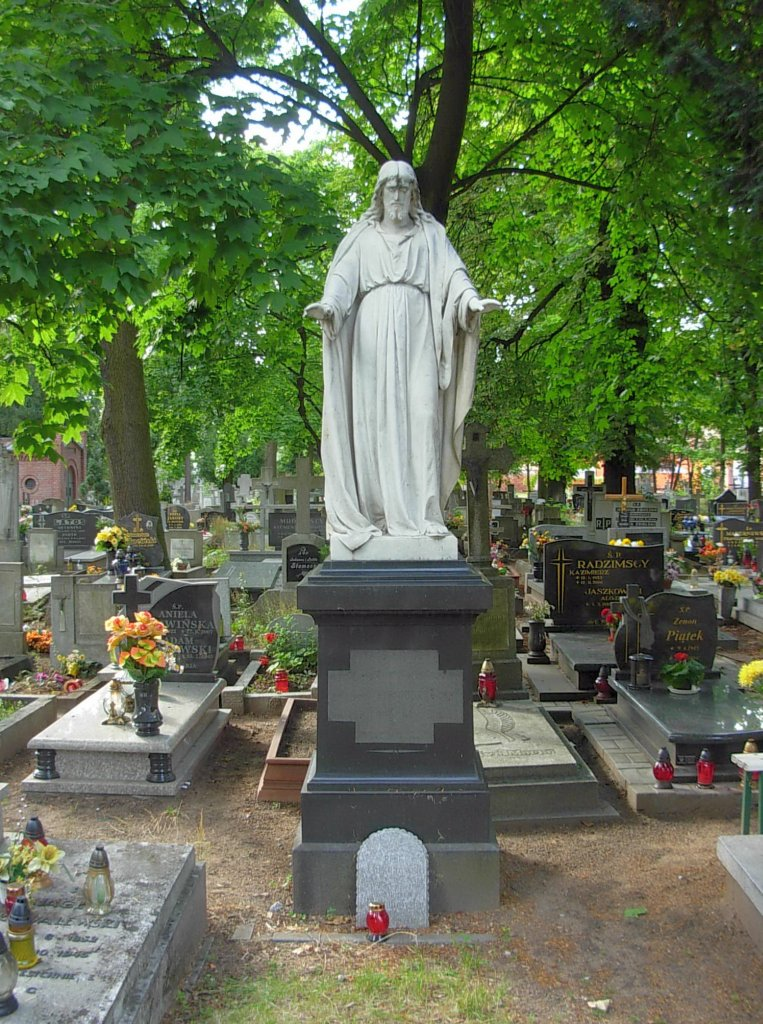
Tomb statue

=== Tenement at 18 ===
1900s

Eclecticism, elements of Art Nouveau

Located in front of Starofarny cemetery's main gate, this 3-storey building was owned by Rudolf Wolff, a merchant in wood and cigars.

One of the earliest houses built on this avenue, it recalls many other eclectic edifices of the city one can find in Gdańska, Pomorska, or Dworcowa streets. One can appreciate the large pediments, the Art Nouveau-like details around the second-floor openings, and the dormers with oeil-de-boeuf windows.

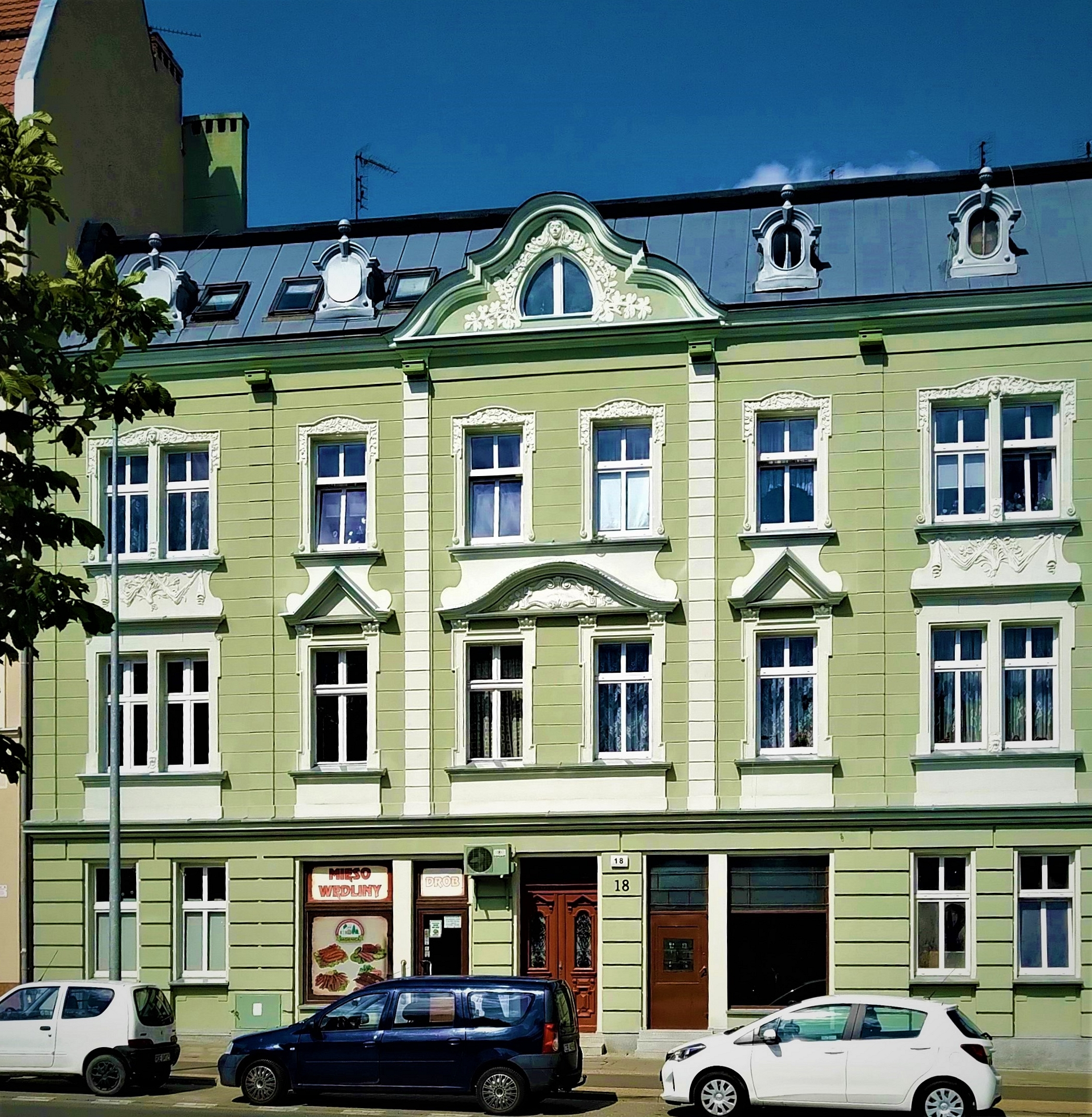
View of the facade

=== Tenement at 19 ===
1875-1900

Neo Classicism

Settled along the northern side of the cemetery, the edifice, at its construction, was situated on the Schleusenau city land. As such, its address was Schleusenau 2 then 2 Linden straße. His commissioner was a rentier, Alexander von Beulwitz.

Well-balanced frontage, the only architectural motifs left are floral stuccoed friezes on the lintel of the second-floor windows.

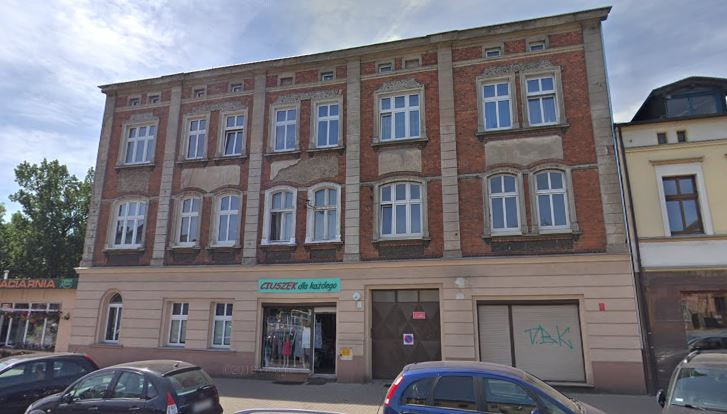
Main elevation

=== Tenements at 20/22/24 ===
Beginning 20th century

Early Modern architecture

The three buildings date back to the same period, transitioning from fading Art Nouveau to canted forms of early modernism. This shift appears differently on each of them. While the elevation in the middle (Nr.22) is bare of any decoration, its neighbours still display some elements of the late 19th-century style:

- wrought iron volutes in the car passageway, adorned portal and oeil-de-boeuf for Nr.20;
- semicircular transom for Nr.24.
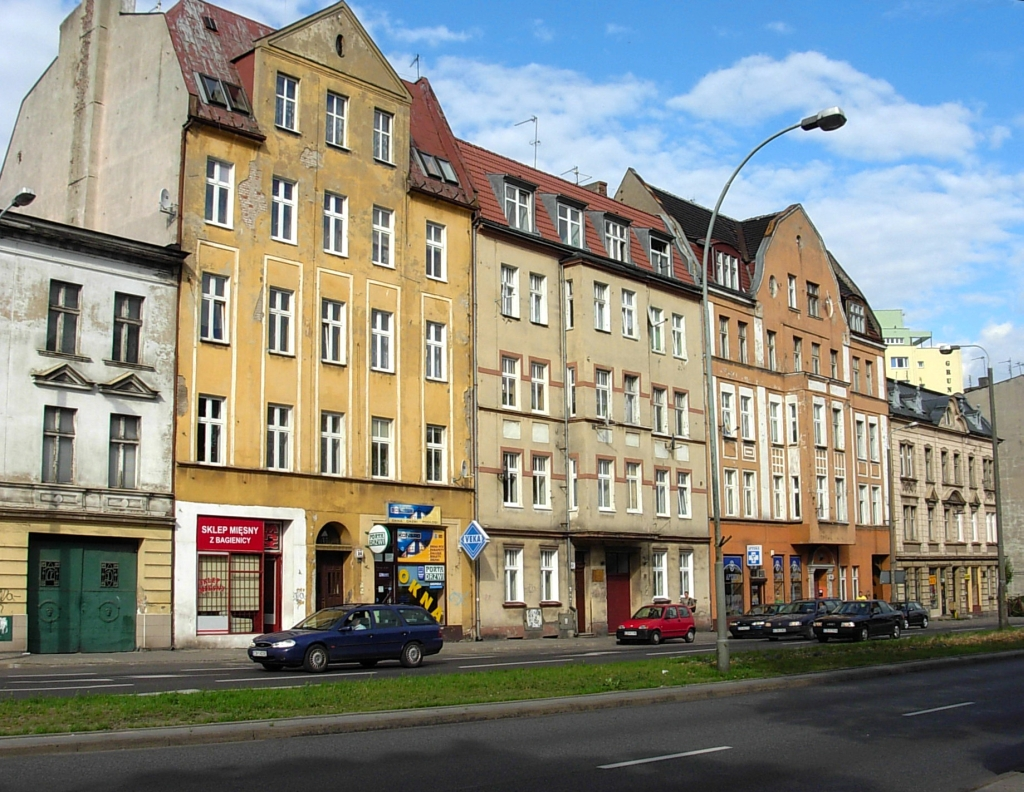
View of the frontages from the street

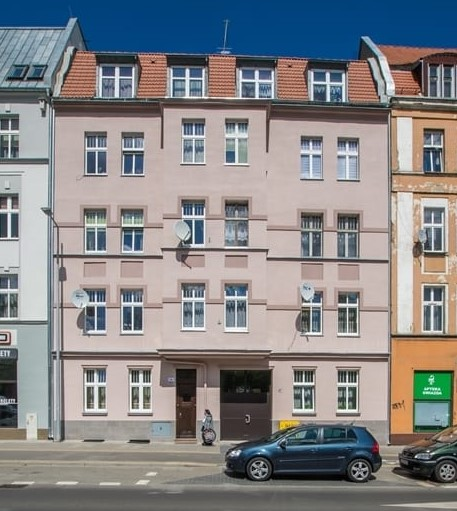
Facade at 22

=== Tenement at 26, corner with Graniczna street ===
Late 1890s

Eclecticism

Located at the time as the last edifice within Bromberg city limits on the avenue, its first landlord was Thomas Diete, who established there a tavern To the Golden Star (German: Gasthof Zum Goldener Stern).

The decoration of the late 19th century has been lost today. Few elements (pediments) remain from the eclectic architectural details, as one can see from early pictures.

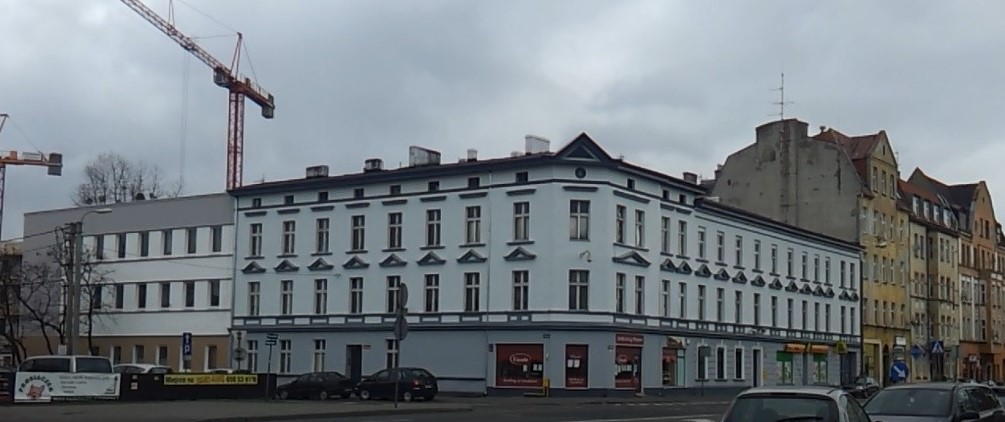
Building at 26 Grunwaldzka after renovation

=== Plot at 30/32, former BELMA Factory ===
1875–1899

In 1868, Carl Fiebrandt, a journeyman, founded a small mechanical at workshop 11 Dworcowa Street producing and repairing agricultural machinery. Looking for a place to expand his industry, he bought in 1875, a plot in Okole suburb, at the intersection of Schaussestrasse and Granzstrasse (today's Grunwaldzka and Graniczna streets) and built there a large one-story hall. He quickly realized that the rapid expansion of railways could be a bonanza for him. Hence in 1892, he dedicated exclusively the production to signaling and train traffic control devices. In 1899, Fiebrandt established the C. Fiebrandt & Co-Eisenbahn-Signalbau-Anstalt Gesellschaft (English: Railway signal building company). During WWII, the firm produced shells for machine guns that were handloaded in the Bromberg Dynamit Nobel AG Factory located in the southern forest area of the city.

After WWII, the firm was taken over by the state treasury and get its name changed first to Bydgoska Fabryka Sygnałów Kolejowych (English: Bydgoszcz Railway Signal Factory-State Enterprise), then in 1958 to Bydgoskie Zakłady Elektromechaniczne (English: Bydgoszcz Electro-Mechanical Works) or BELMA. In 1951, the factory started to produce for army: it is now its business staple. In 2018, the firm celebrated its 150th anniversary from its production site located in the vicinity of Bydgoszcz, at Białe Błota.

Today are still visible the wrought iron grate of the main gate, flanked by two front buildings onto the street at 30 and 32.

=== Tenement at 34 ===
Early 1880s

Neo-Renaissance, elements of Neo-Baroque

The edifice was initially located on Okole village land, under the address 5 Chaussee Straße: the landlord was Ludwik Dürr, a butcher. His son Ernst took over the business and ran it till the late 1920s. A butcher shop has been operated there till the outbreak of WWII.

The elevation is rendered unbalanced by the heavy bossaged bay window featuring a loggia. The left side shows adorned windows with festoons in cartouches, pilasters, curved pediments bearing a stylized coat of arms and a top corbel table.

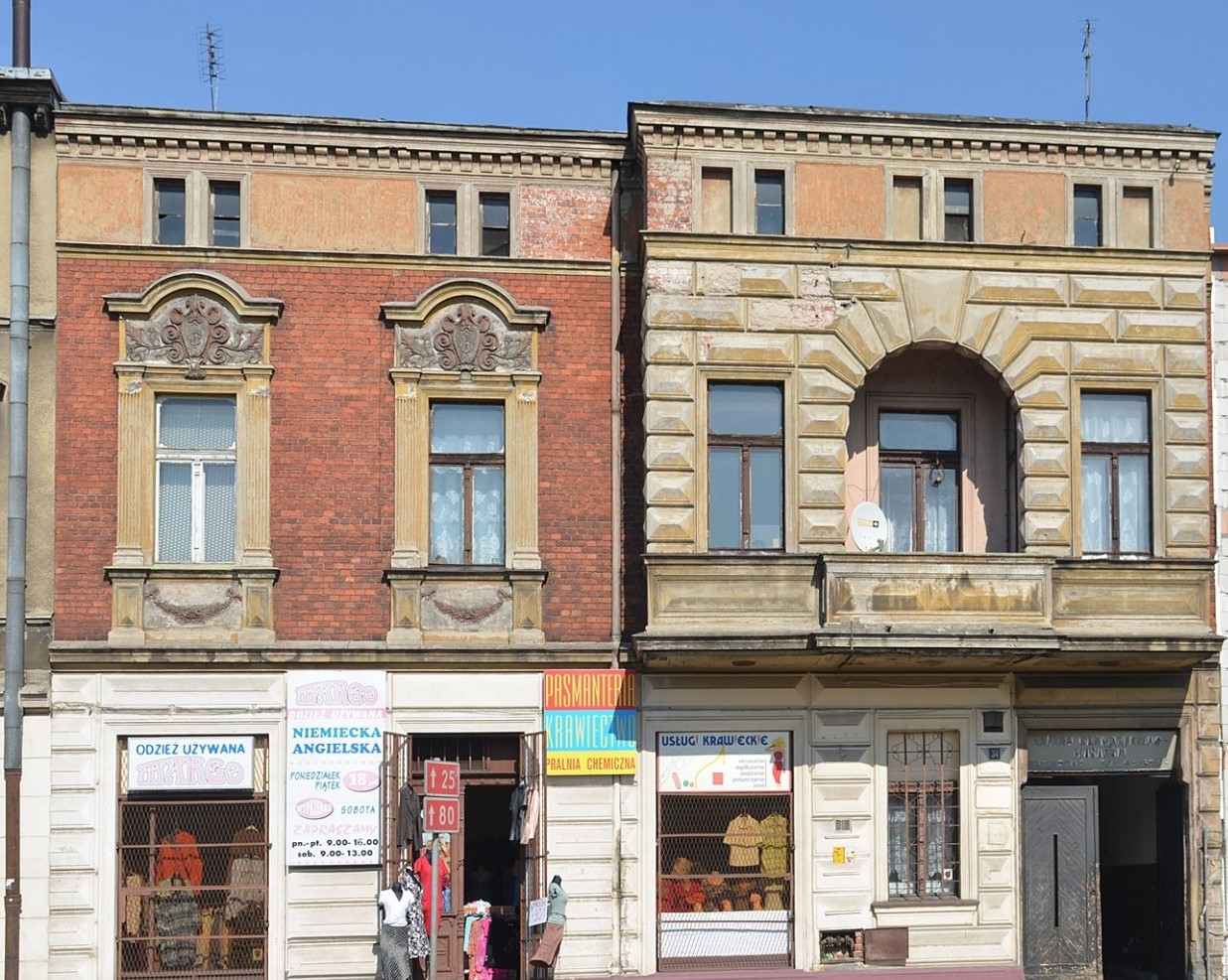
Facade at 34 Grunwaldzka

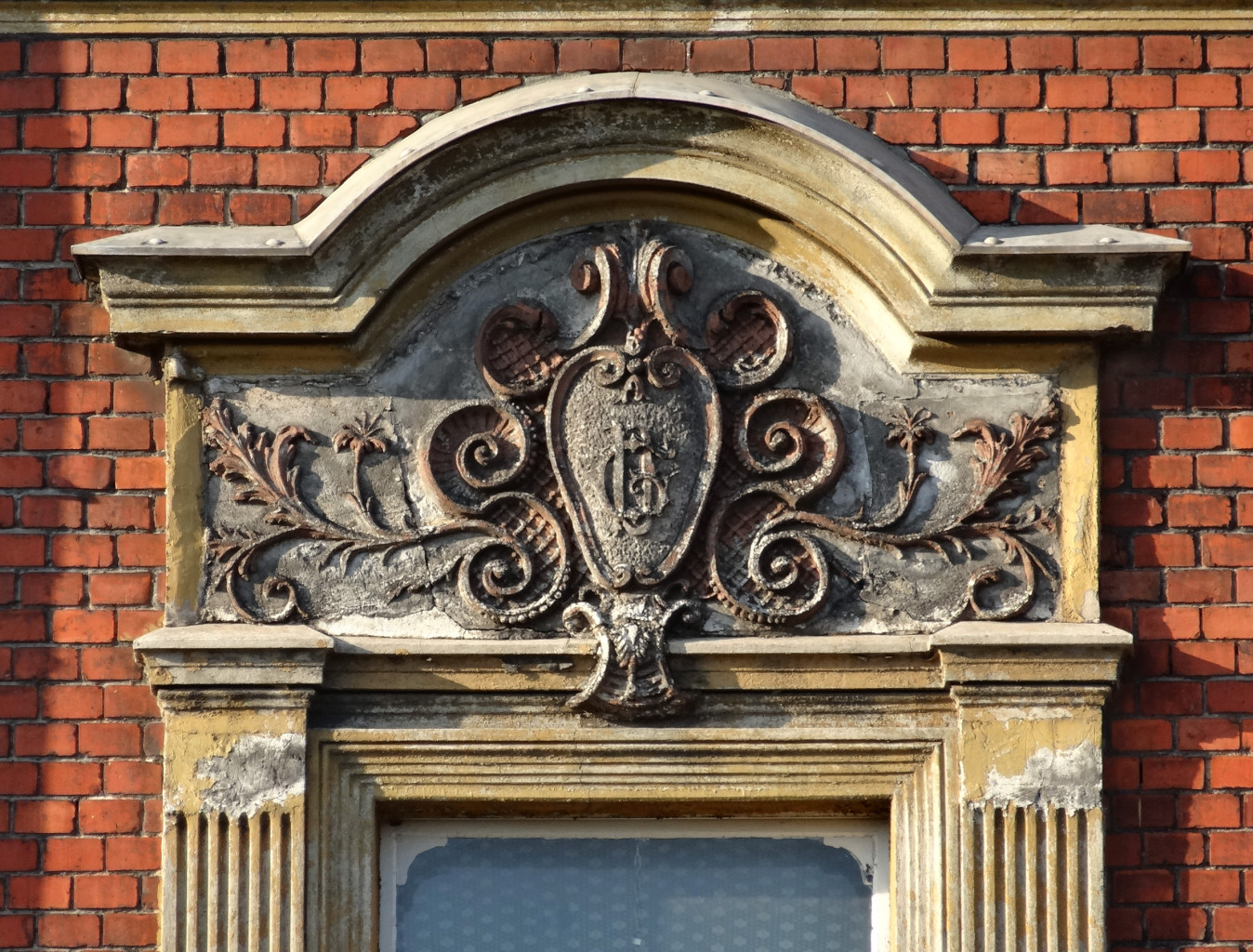
Detail of the pediment

=== Tenement at 35 ===
1850-1900

Eclecticism

Situated in Schleusenau suburb, at 9 Lindenstraße, it was the property of a carpenter, Heinrich Gürich. In the 1910s, the ground floor housed a plumber store ran by Friedrich Kolbe (see gallery) at 107 Chaussee straße.

The balanced facade has been renovated in 2017.

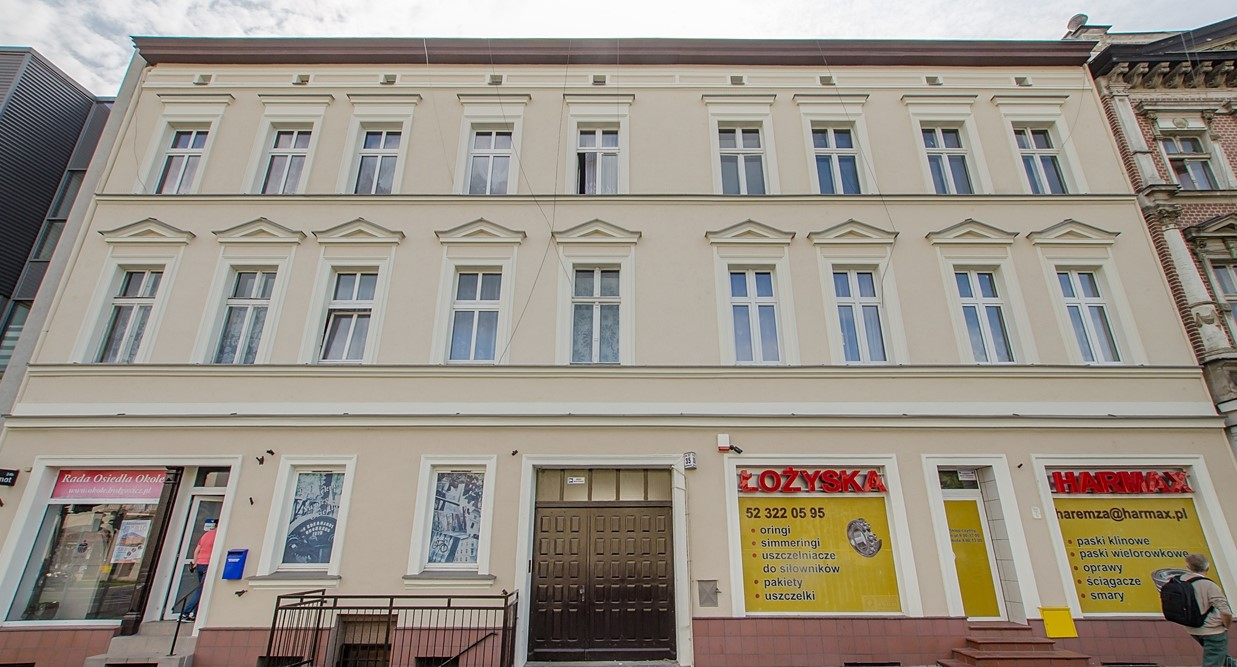
Renovated elevation

=== Pharmacy Under the lion at 37 ===
1894, by Józef Święcicki and Karl Bergner

Neo Baroque, Rococo and Mannerism

Dr Leonhard Tonn began to run a pharmacy at this spot before commissioning the house. He contracted architect Józef Swiecicki who worked with Karl Bergner; builder was well-known entrepreneur Carl Rose. In March 1894 Dr. Tonn established the Löwen Apotheke Laboratorium für chemische und mikroskopische Untersuchungen - Dr. L. Tonn (English: Under the lion-Pharmacy laboratory for chemical and microscopic analysis). On October 15, 1924, while Bydgoszcz had reintegrated Polish territory, the shop was sold to Piotr and Henryk Umbreit, two brothers from Poznań. In 1880, they had already founded in their city a pharmaceutical and chemical warehouse, at that time the second Polish medicine factory in Poznań. In parallel, a medical cabinet opened in the house: in May 1926, dr. Teofil Kowalski from Warsaw succeeded to dr. Keslinger, from Gdańsk. During the Second World War, the management of the pharmacy was taken over by German chemist Georg Kubisch, a member of SA from Gdańsk, and the name changed to Löwen Apotheke. In 1940, the pharmacy receives the name Hindenburg Apotheke since it was also used as a training facility for chemistry students. In 1951, the firm was nationalized as Social Pharmacy Nr.12, but its original name Pod Lwem was reinstated in 1978.

At its opening, the pharmacy was equipped with oak furniture imported from Berlin, the bronze lion painted in gold came from Italy.The emblem is one of the few original preserved pharmacy emblems in Poland. The building boasts a rich decoration dominated by various styles elements (Neo Baroque, Rococo and Mannerism). Together with the standing golden lion, the house is characterized by its onion dome bearing a weather vane with a lion silhouette.

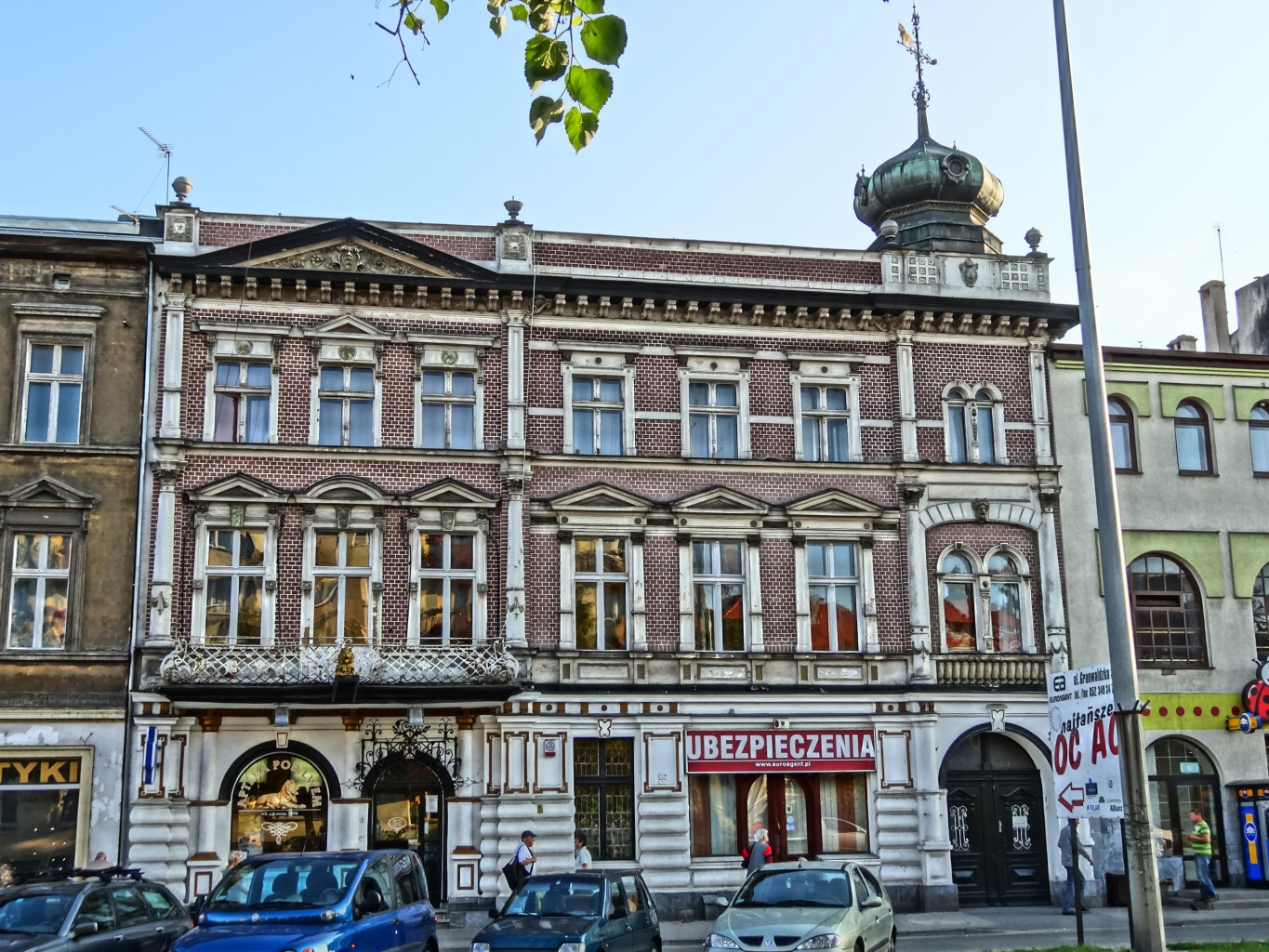
Elevation on the street

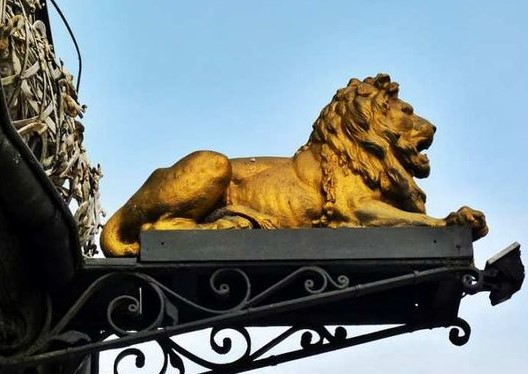
Pharmacy emblem

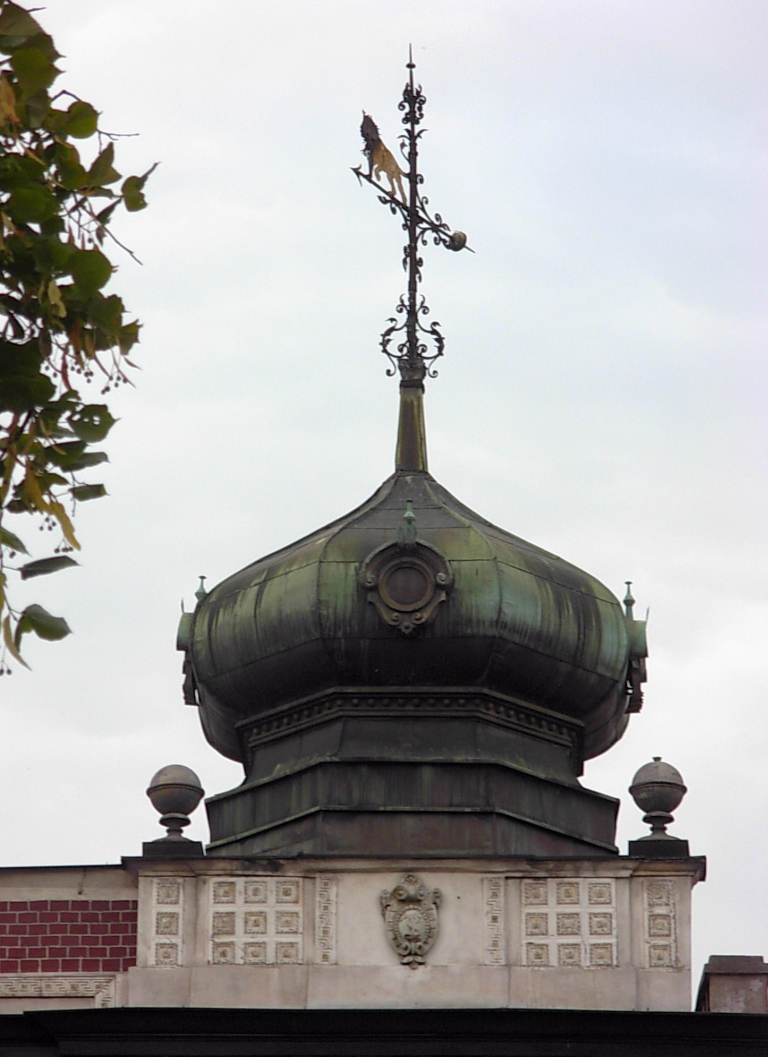
Neo Baroque onion dome

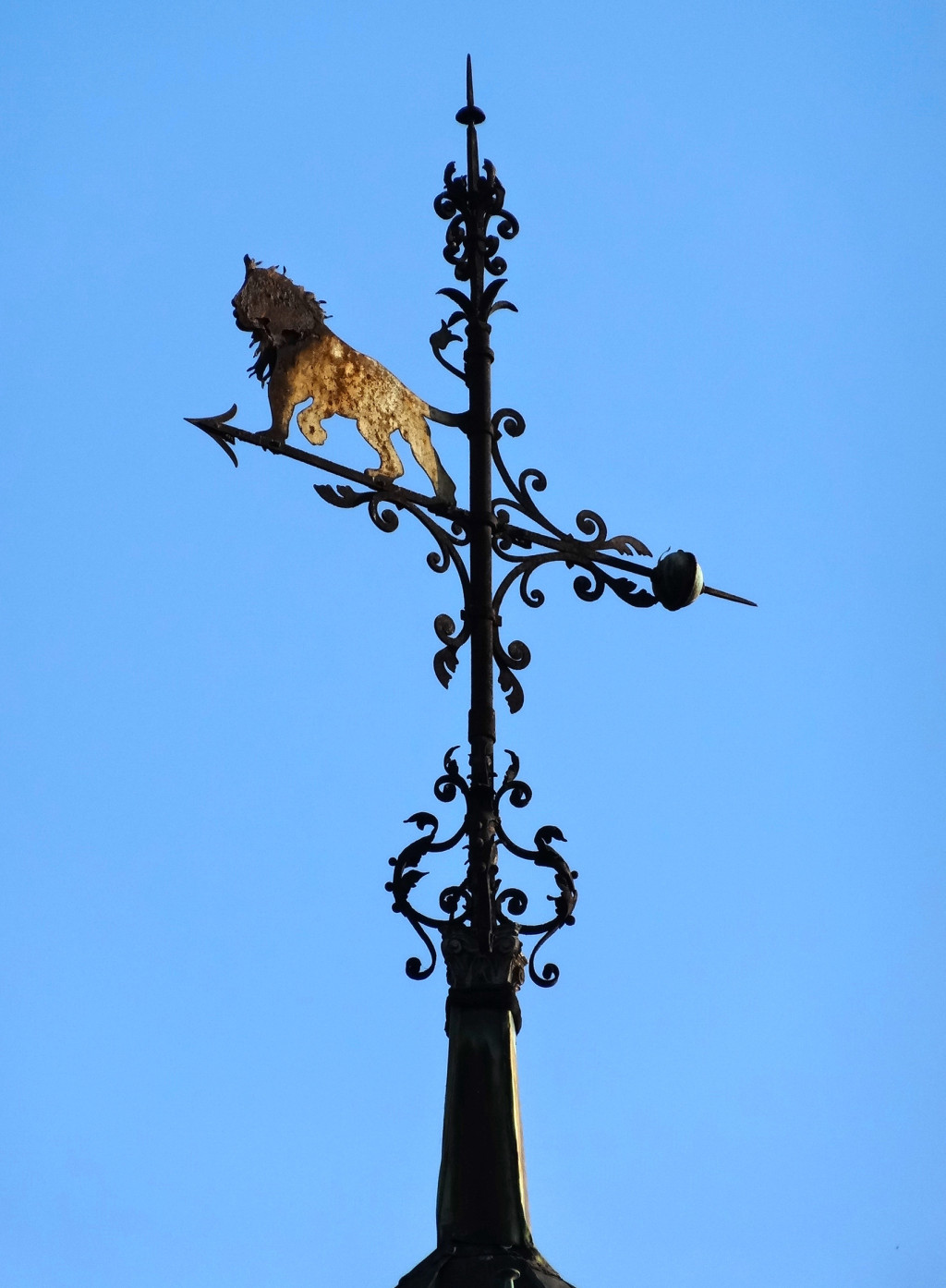
Detail of the weather vane

=== Tenement at 42, corner with Jasna Street ===
End of 19th century-1905, by F. Pretzel

Art Nouveau

Built in Okole suburb at 7 Chausseestraße, its owner was a merchant, Carl Raddatz. The Raddatz family kept the property till the outbreak of WWII. Wanda Górska, daughter of Władysław Piórek lived there from 1945 till her death in 1980.

The building has undergone an overhaul in 2017, underlining the stuccoed motifs, especially on the pedimented wall dormer giving onto Grunwaldzka street.

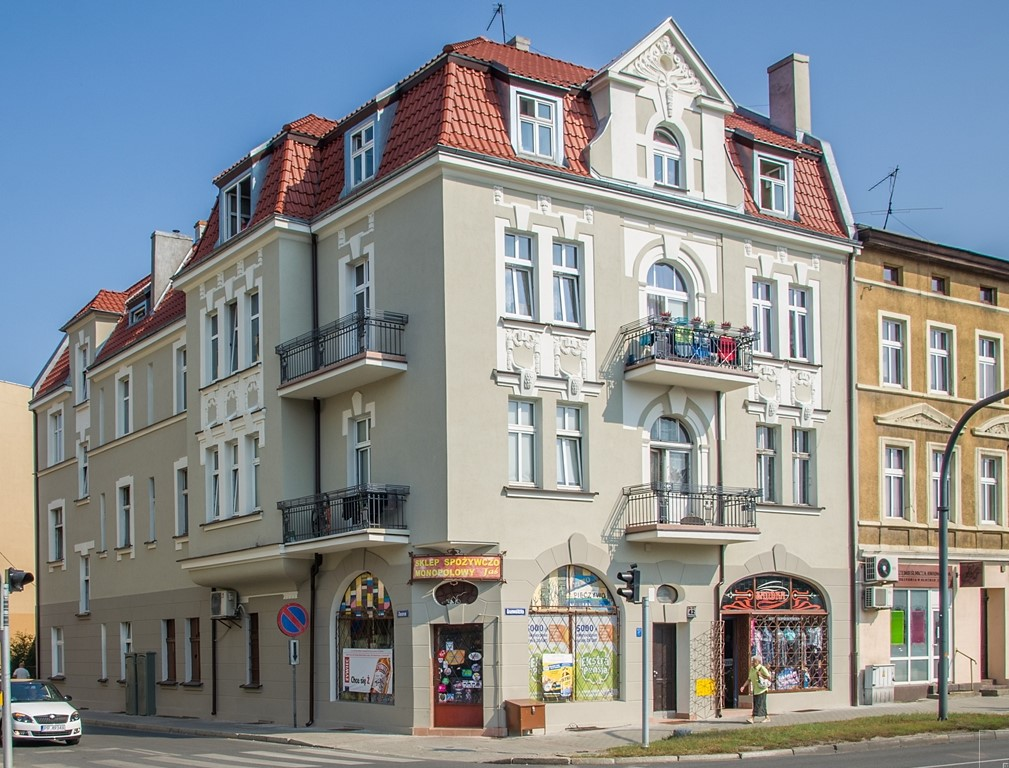
View from the street crossing

=== Tenement at 49 ===
1885

Eclecticism

Constructed on Schleusenau ground in the late 1880s, it has been commissioned by Ludwig Wegener, a boatsman.

The building endured a renovation in 2016.

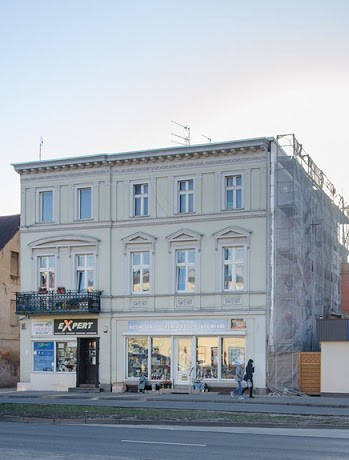
Facade on Grunwaldzka street

=== Building at 50 ===
1958-1959

Modern architecture, Neoclassical architecture

This large edifice was commissioned by the firm BELMA settled at Nr.30/32. It was designed as a cultural and educational center (Polish: Dom Kultury) for the benefit of BELMA employees and later also for students from nearby schools. During holidays in particular, the institution used to organize puppet theater performances and film screenings. Today the edifice houses the Kuyavian-Pomeranian Tax Office in Bydgoszcz.

The facility has a large auditorium with a stage. It is an architectural example of Socialist realist construction. In Bydgoszcz, it is the second largest public facility built after 1950, after the Pomeranian Philharmonic.

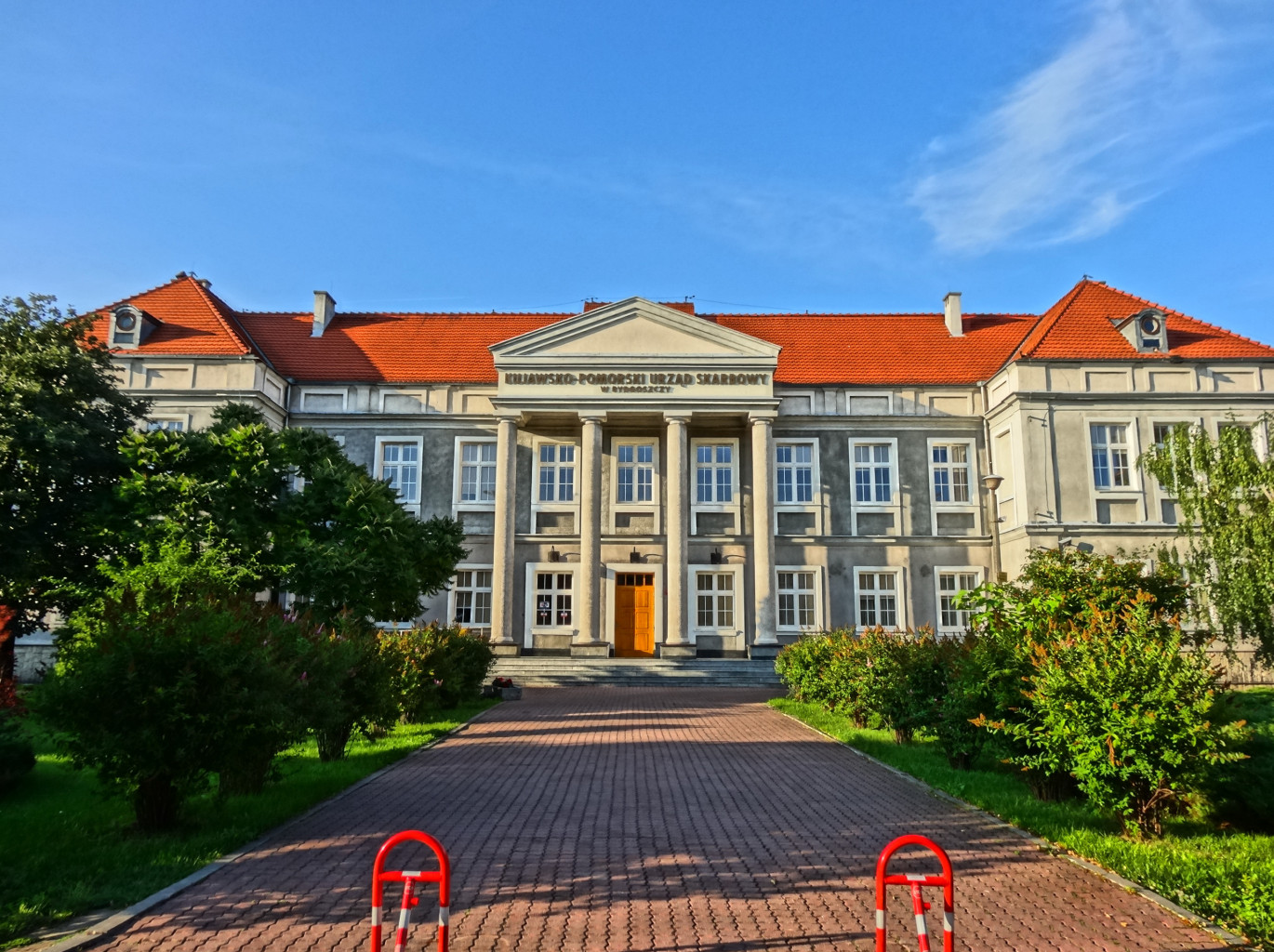
View of the facade on Grunwaldzka street

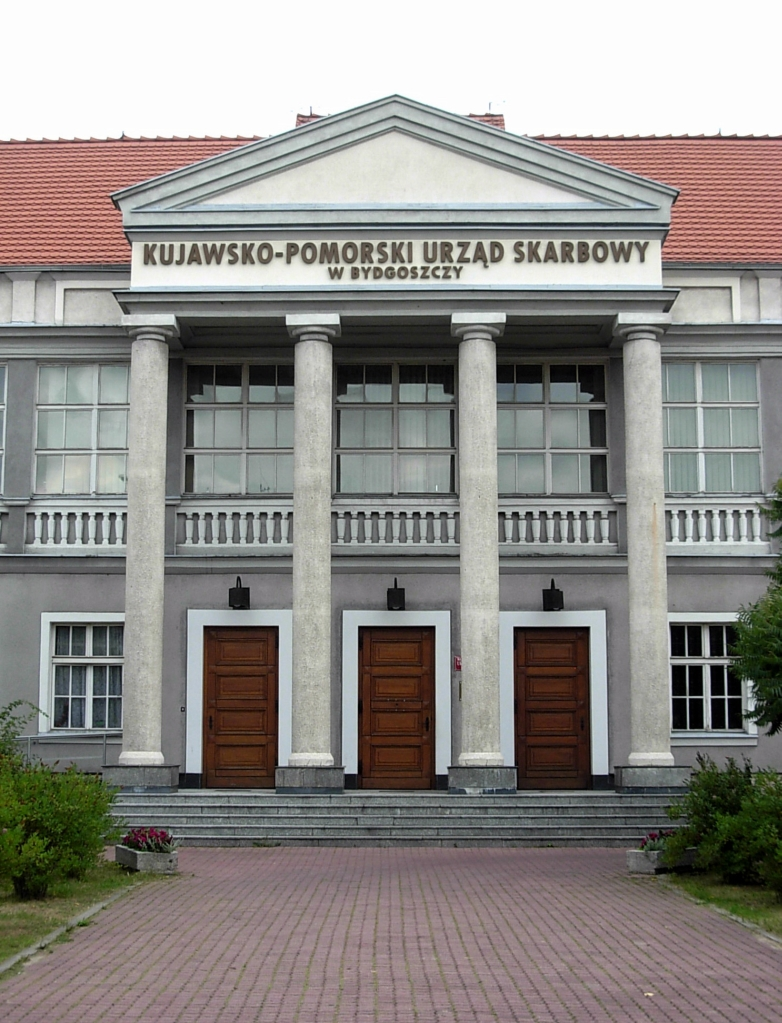
Detail of the portal with columns

=== Tenement at 53 ===
Registered on the Kuyavian-Pomeranian Voivodeship Heritage List (A/1681 July 24, 2015).

1890

Eclecticism

Eduard Schulz, the house investor, was a secretary of the railway. The property remained in the hands of the Schulz family during the interwar period.

On the facade boasts a collection of ornamentation:

- a main entrance flanked by corinthian style columns;
- a bossage wall on the ground floor;
- the first belt course supports pilasters and a columned loggia with a round architrave;
- the second string course carries two series of round top mullioned windows separated by an oeil-de-boeuf;
- a large cornice tops the frontage.

This house has been refurbished in 2019.

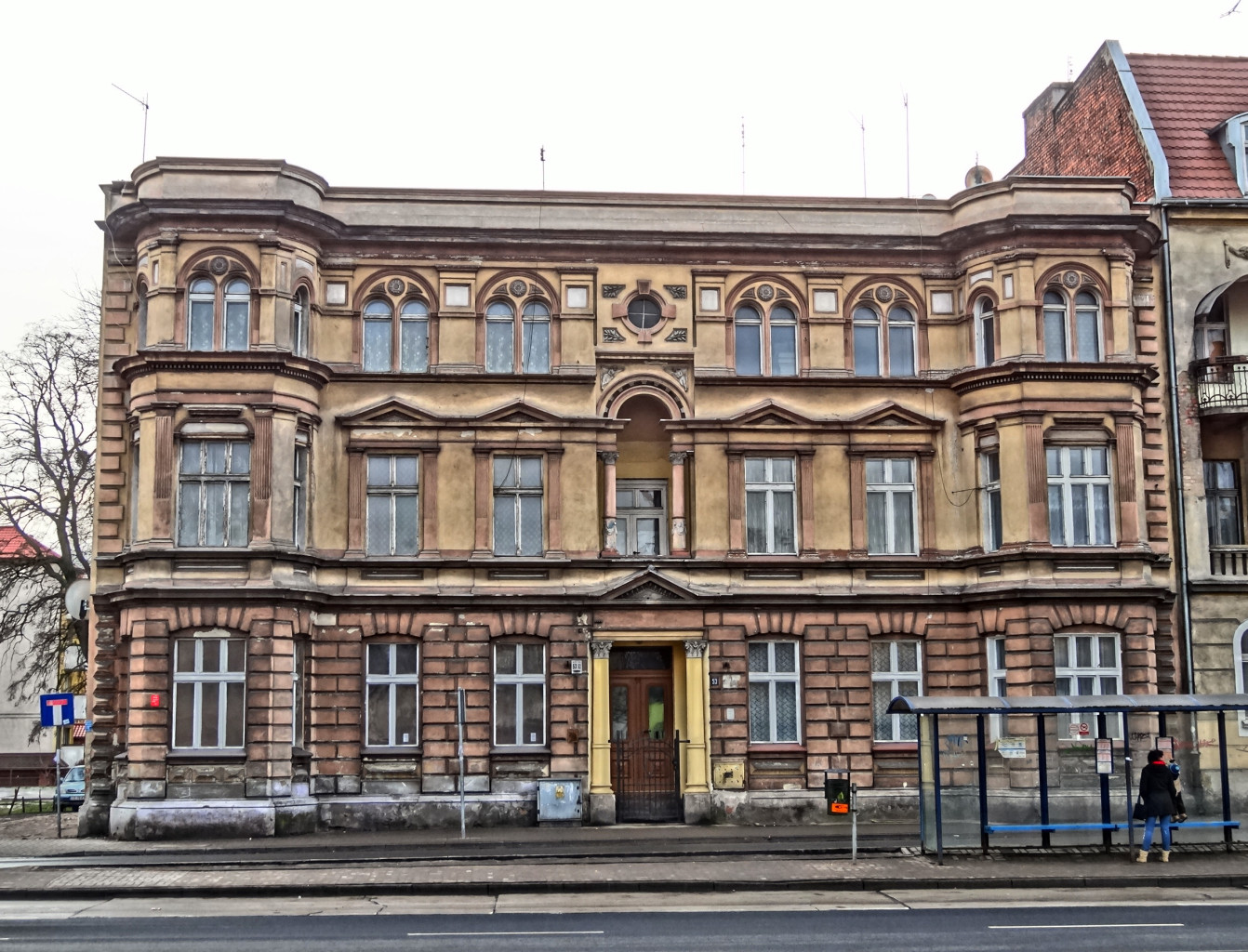
Building before renovation

=== Building at 55 ===
1890

Art Nouveau

The commissioner of this building was Marie Jacobowski, owner of tenements at Nr.57 and 59, where she lived. After a heavy fire damage in 2012, the municipal authorities have decided in 2019 to sell the property to private hands.

Renovated in 2025, the main elevation offers to the viewer topping loggias crowned by a festoon, a bay window with geometrical motifs and an adorned portal.

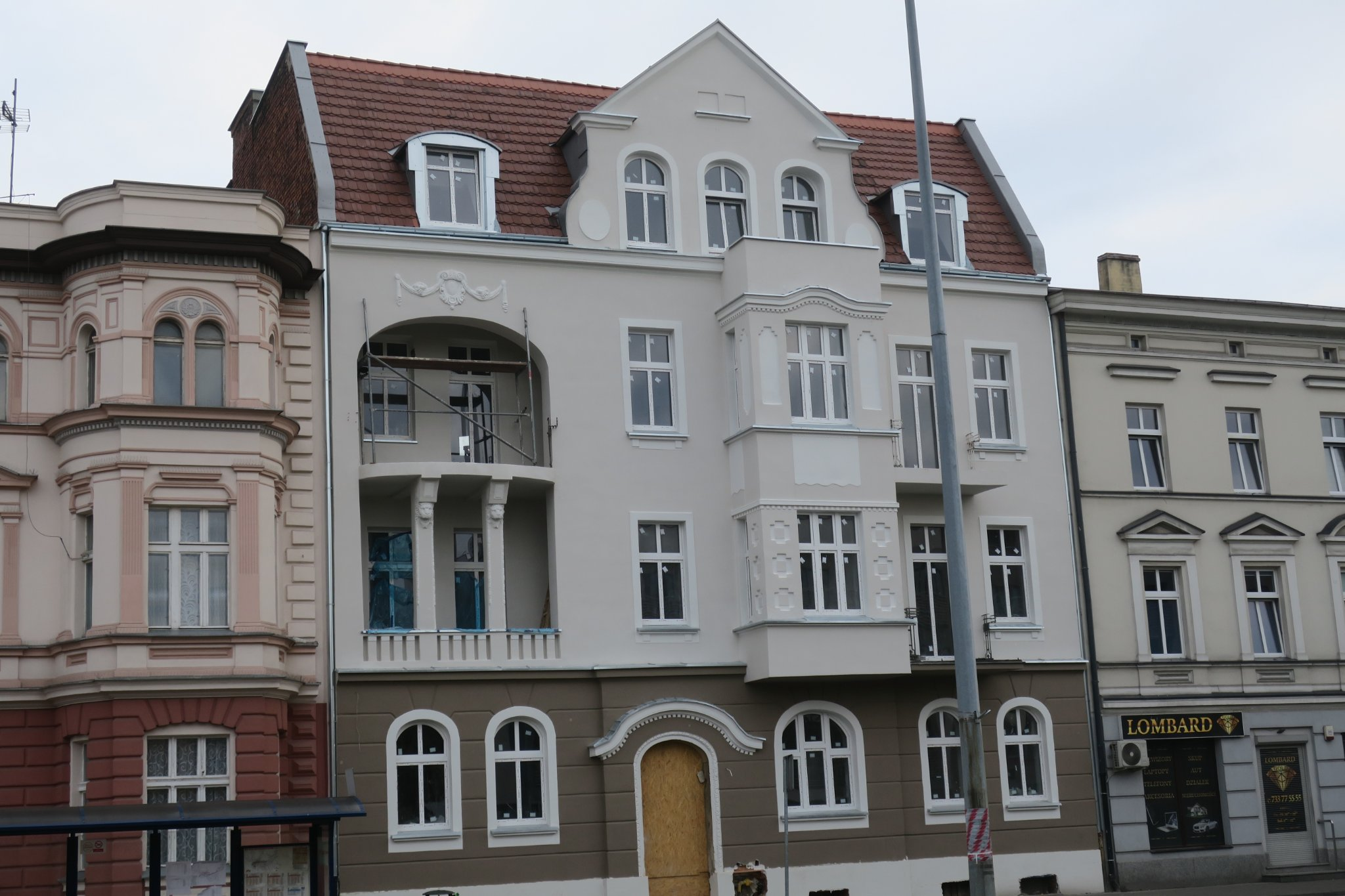
Restored facade

=== Tenements at 57/59, corner with Kanałowa street ===
End 19th century

Eclecticism

Both buildings (along with Nr.55) were the property of Marie Jacobowski, who lived at 59. Between the early 1900s and the end of the interwar period, the ground floor at 57 housed a tobacco shop.

Facades did not keep the architectural richness: still noticeable are the corner wrought iron balconies facing each other across Kanałowa street. The tenement at 57 has been refurbished in 2017–2018.

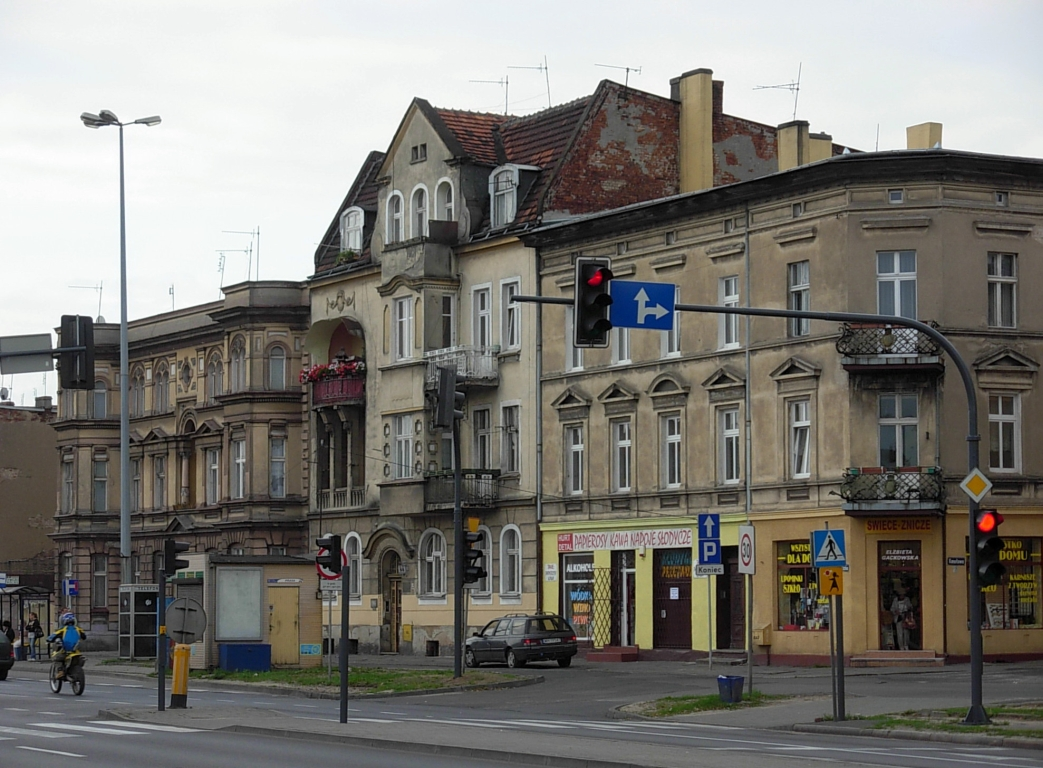
Building at 57 (far right) before renovation

=== Tenements at 72/74 and 78 ===
End 19th century

Eclecticism

While Nr.72 and 74 had private owners, the tenement at 78 was initially the property of the Prussian Eastern Railway, as its location commanded a view on the line from Bromberg to Kaliningrad. After 1920 and the restoration of the Polish state, the house was taken over by the Bydgoszcz Railway (Polish: Bydgoskie Koleje Powiatowe), the local district of the Polish State Railways (Polish: Polskie Koleje Państwowe).

All three houses are in a neglected state and few details still prevail, apart from the decoration around the windows (pediments, garnished lintel and cartouches).

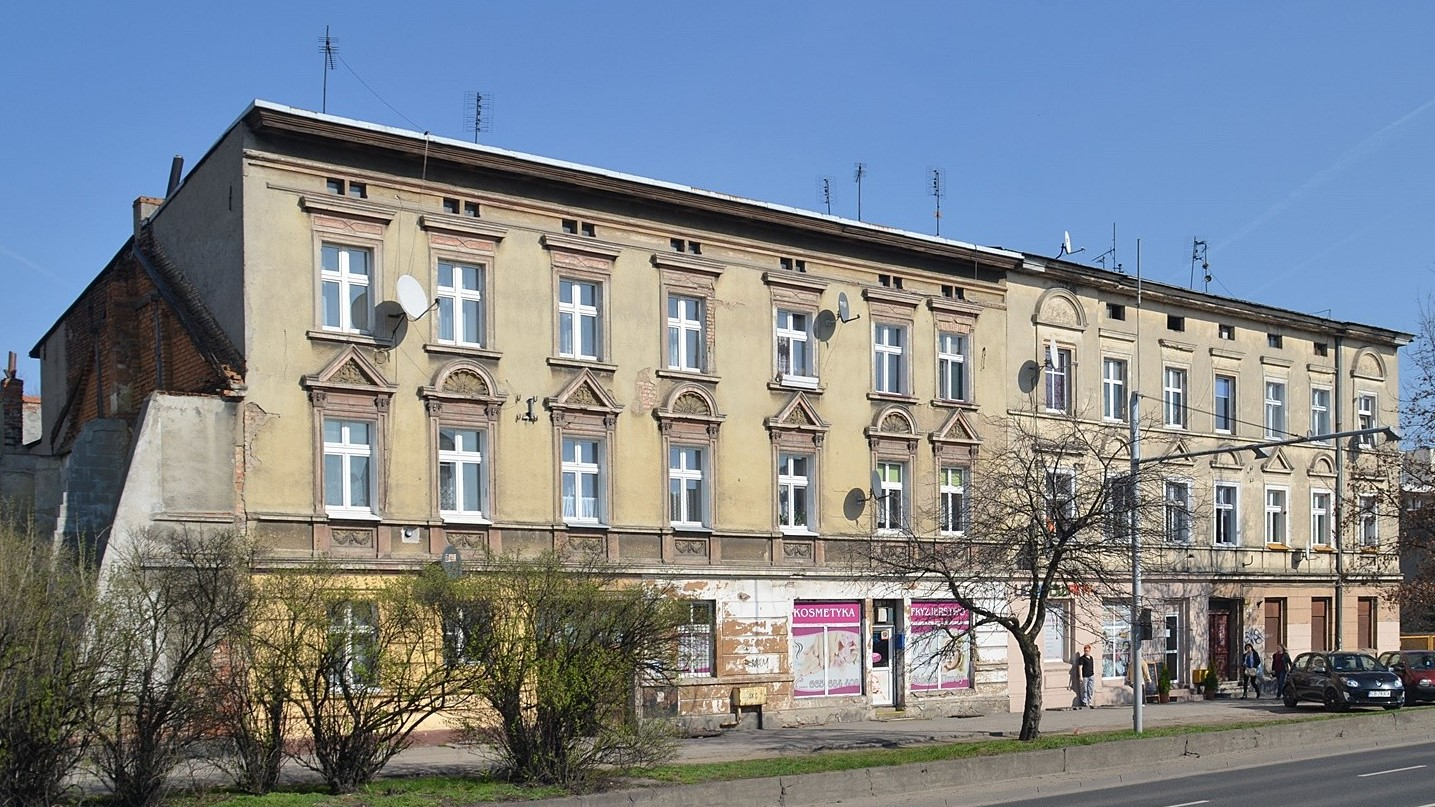
Buildings at 72 74

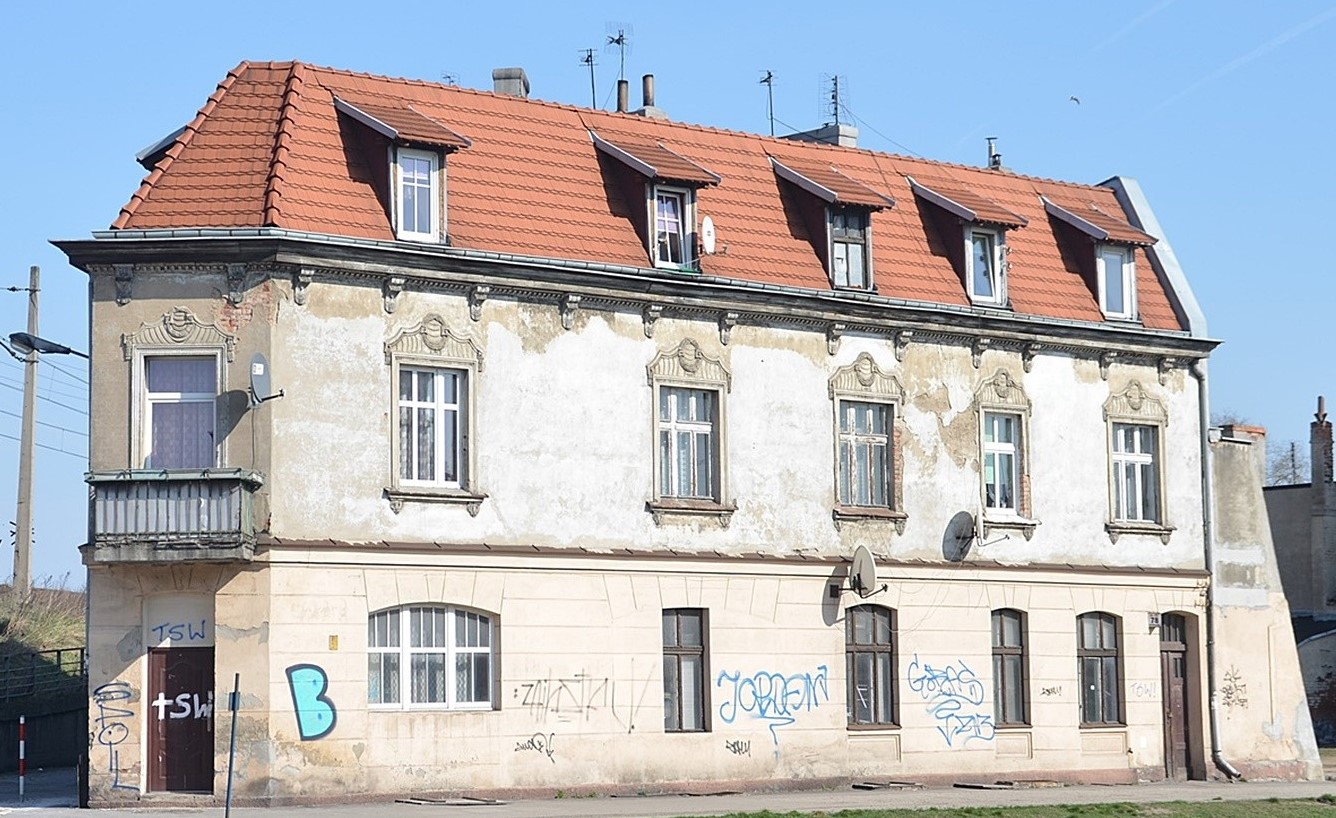
Building at 78

=== Tenement at 98 ===
Early 20th century

Art Nouveau

The commissioner was Heinrich Seellen.

The building has been deeply refurbished in 2019, after a sell by the municipal authorities to a private company. The thorough renovation highlights Art Nouveau motifs, such as the stuccoed patterns on the top of each wall gable crowing the two terraces.

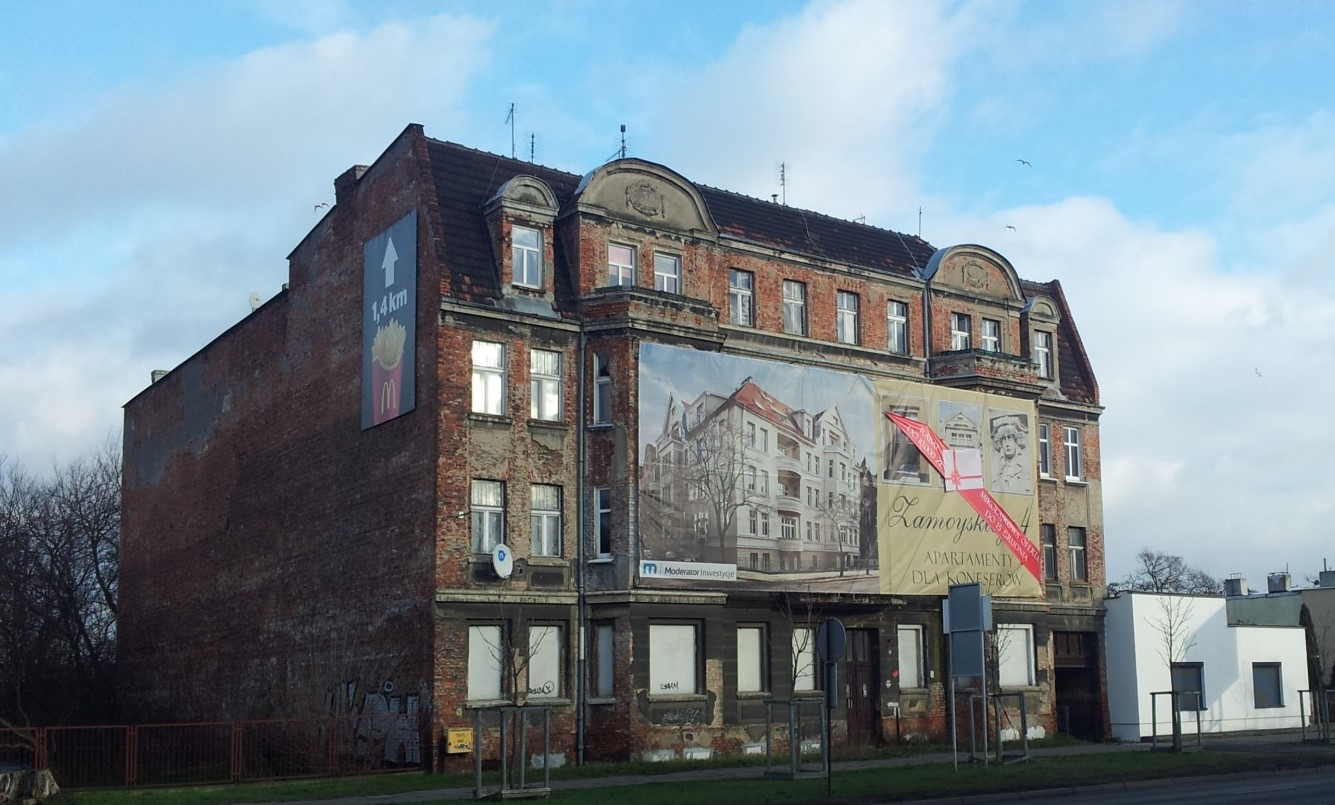
98 Grunwaldzka before restoration

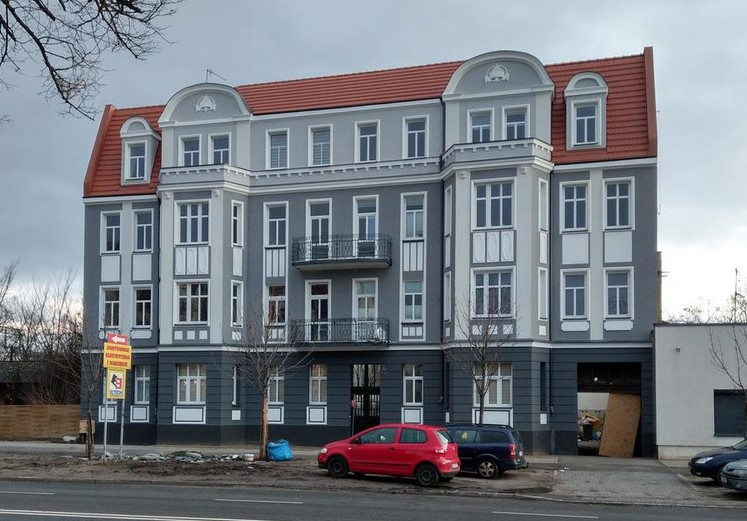
98 Grunwaldzka refurbished

=== Tenements at 102 to 118 ===
Early 20th century

Modern architecture

The ensemble was owned by the Prussian Eastern Railway (German: Preußische Ostbahn) and built in three stages: 1904 (houses 108 to 114), then 1911 (102 and 104) and 1912 (116–118). The railway company housed here its employees, mostly drivers and auxiliary staff, together with some low-level officials. Up to 50 families used to be accommodated in this housing blocks.

At 103, a commemorative plaque has been placed in memoriam of Tadeusz Ziółkowski, the first commander of the port of Gdańsk, who lived here from 1896 to 1927. Native from Wiskitno near Koronowo, he had been shot in 1940 in the Stutthof concentration camp.

A modern project of residence is planned to be squeezed at 106 (only free plot) in 2020.

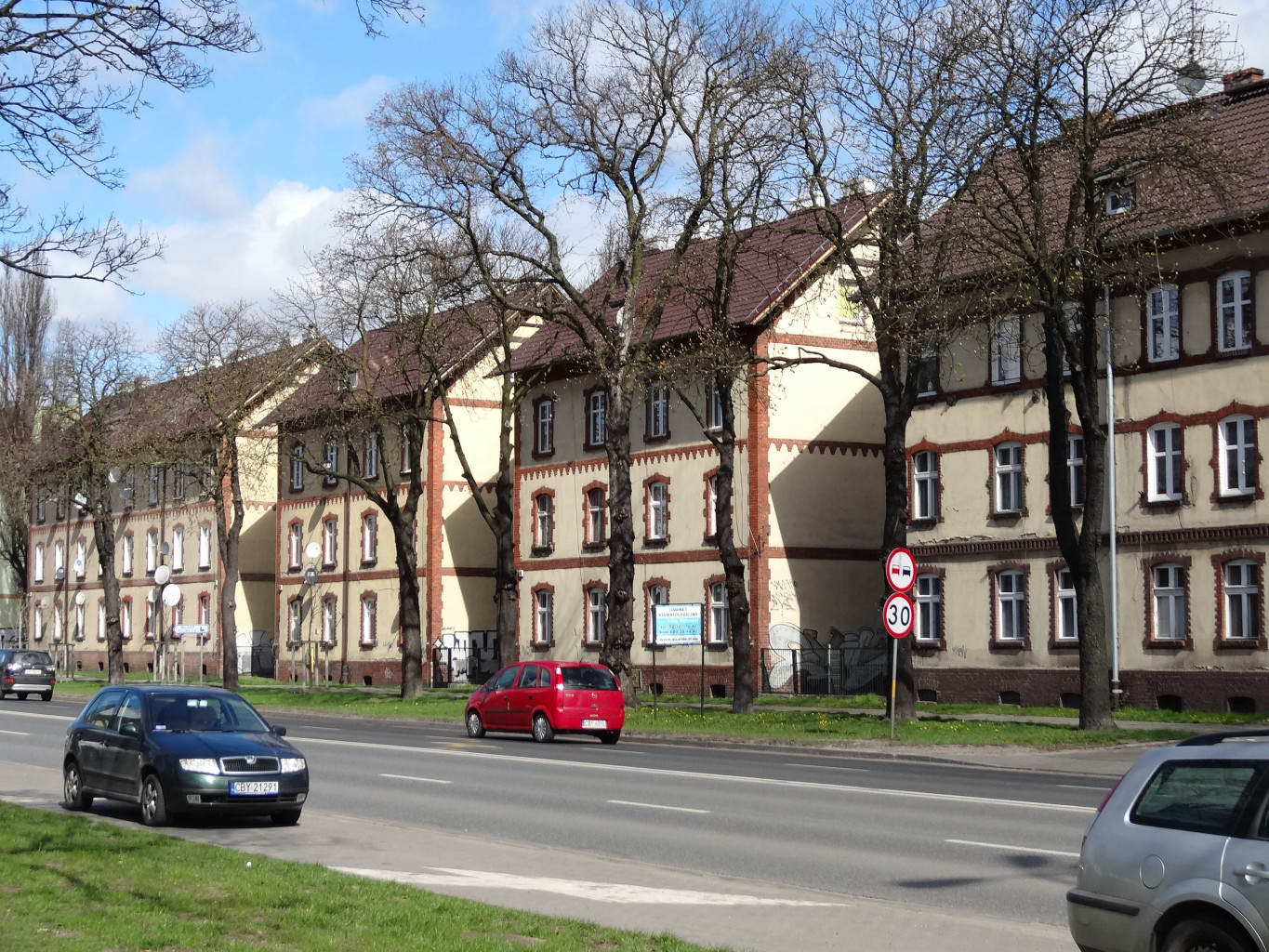
Housing ensemble along the street

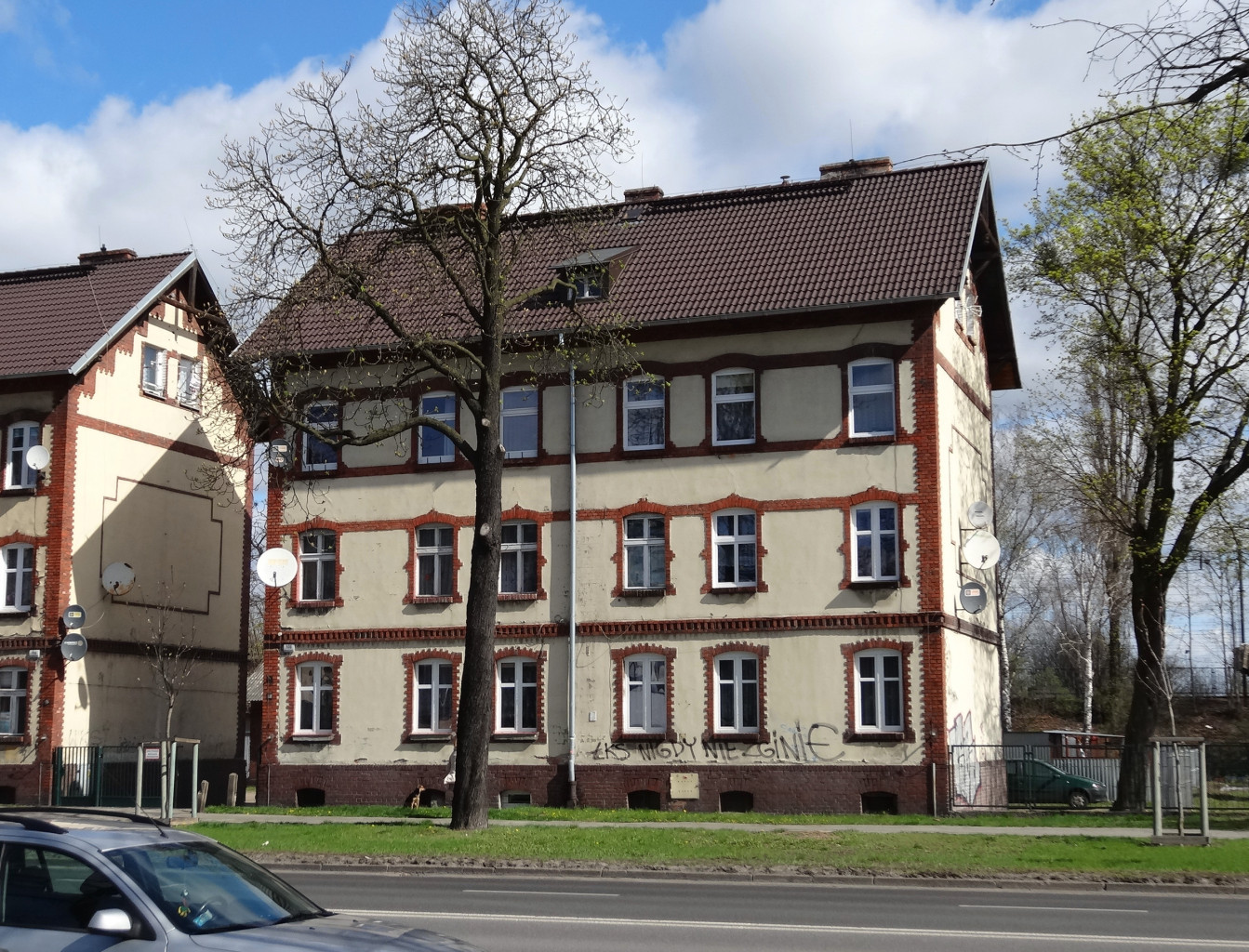
One of the houses

=== Catholic church Saint Anthony of Padua, crossing with Koronowska street ===
Registered on the Kuyavian-Pomeranian Voivodeship Heritage List (Nr.690851 A/1159 August 3, 2006).

1936-1945

Modern architecture

At the time of the re-creation of the Polish state, the area was part of the Czyżkówko village, which will be combined with Bydgoszcz territory in the late 1920s. The new district was subordinated to the downtown parish of the Holy Trinity, several kilometers away. In this situation, a dance hall was purchased in 1923 to be replaced by a chapel, consecrated on February 24, 1924.

A request to create a new parish in this area was granted by bishop August Hlond and the parish was inaugurated on July 1, 1933, dedicated to Anthony of Padua, hence endorsing the separation from the Holy Trinity church. The construction of the church, funded partly by Antoni Laubitz, the bishop of Gniezno, began in 1936: the design was realized a year earlier by Poznań architect Stefan Cybichowski. A decade before, Cybichowski had worked on the site of the Church of Our Lady of Perpetual Help. The edifice was not completed at the start of WWII and had been used by Nazi forces as a warehouse to store construction tools, while religious services were held back in the initial chapel. After the war, the church was left devastated and shelled, but after a hasty renovation, it had been consecrated anew by bishop August Hlond on December 1, 1945.

The massive brick church has three naves, with a semi-circular northern chancel. The highlight of the building is the high square steeple, visible from Grunwaldzka street crossing. Inside, several stained glasses cover the openings. The central nave is separated by pillars with decorative goblets capitals supporting a vaulted roof. Restoration works have started in 2020 on the facade and the tower.

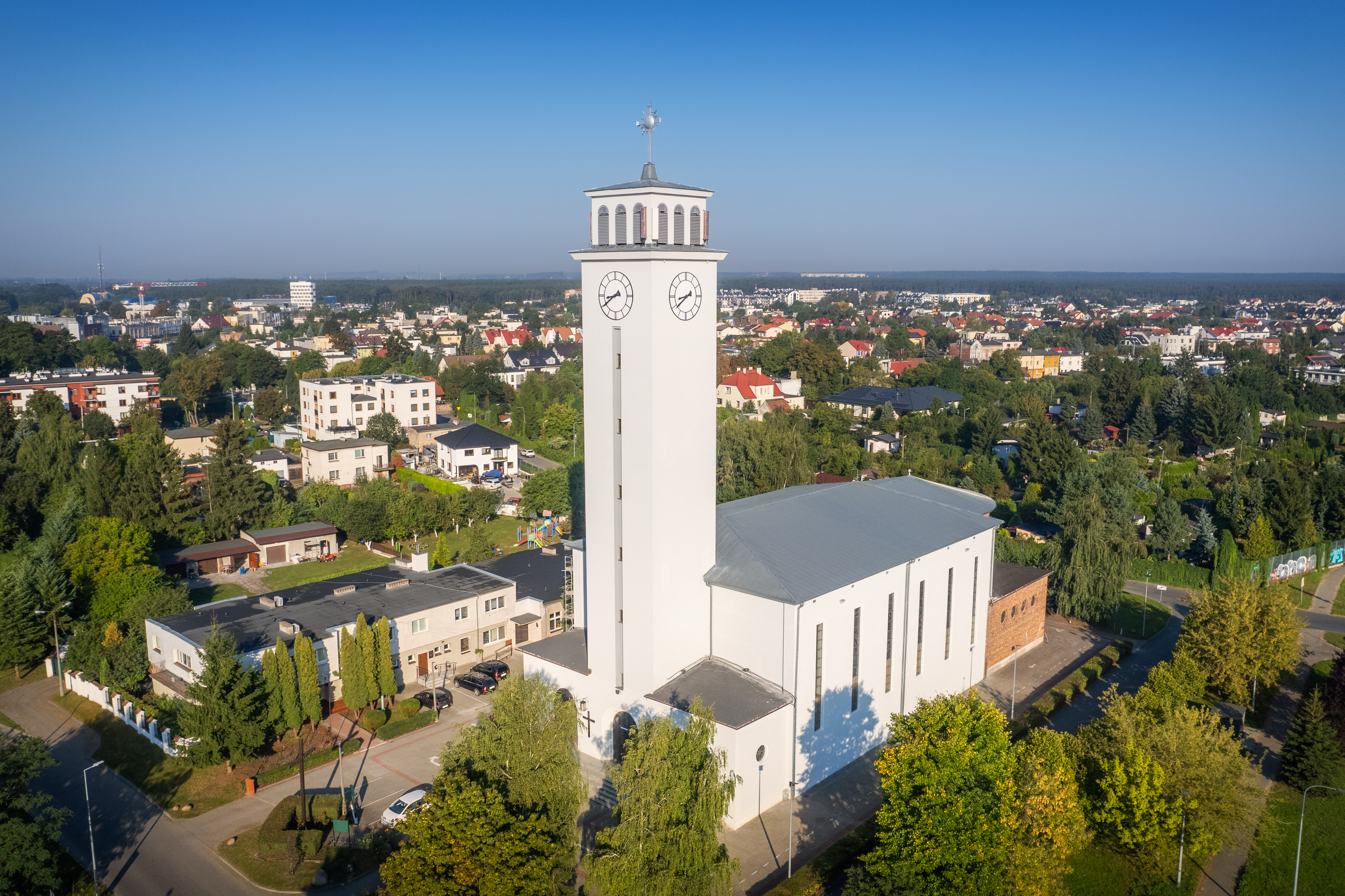
Bird's-eye view

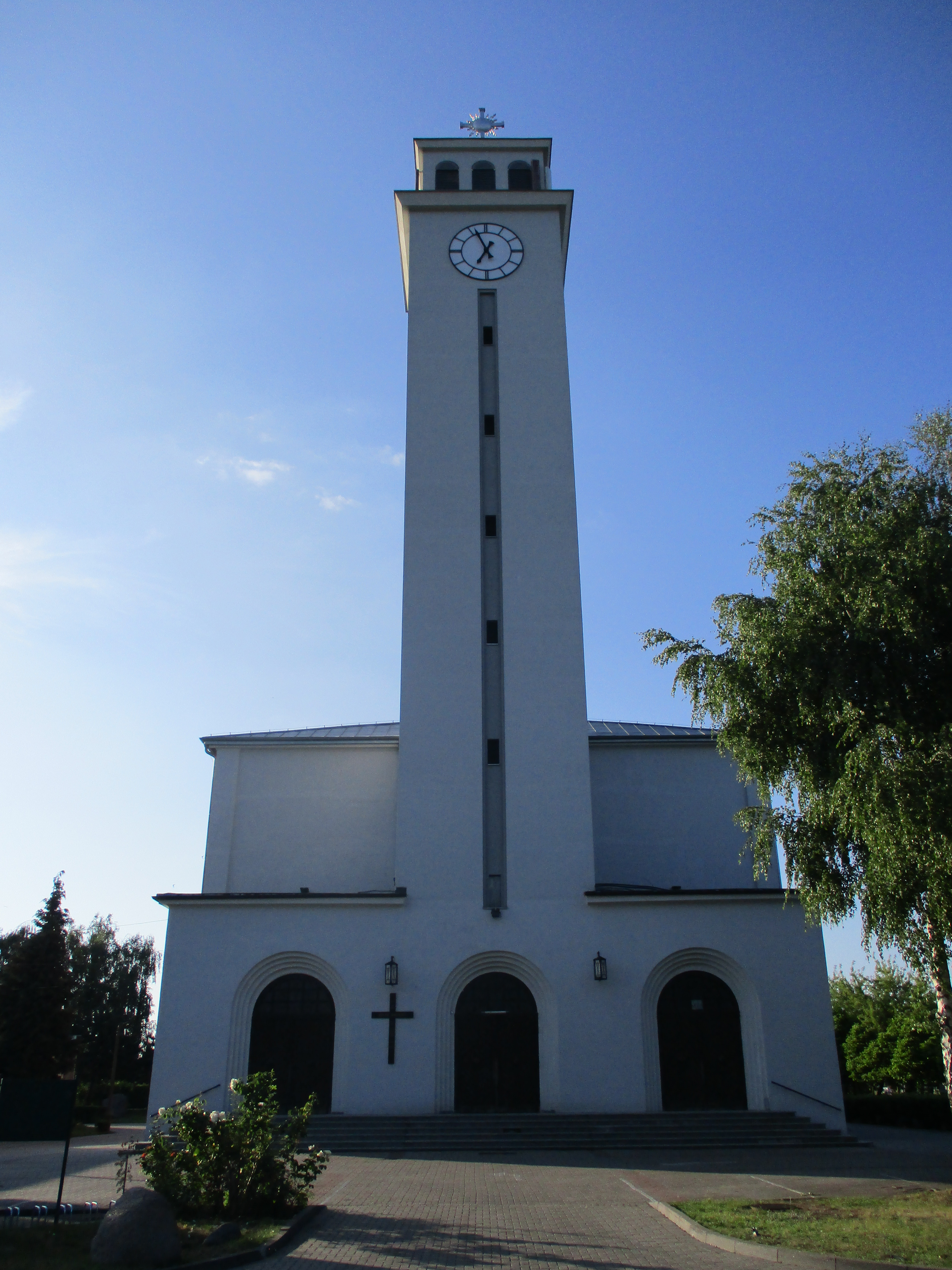
View from the church parvis

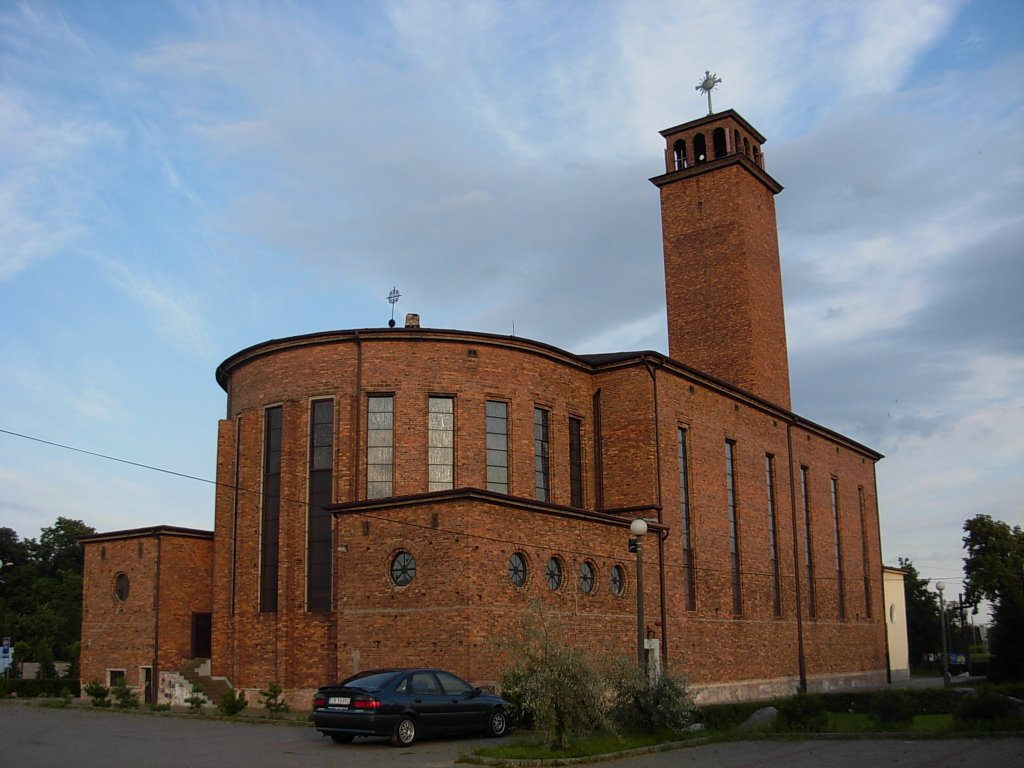
External view of the chancel

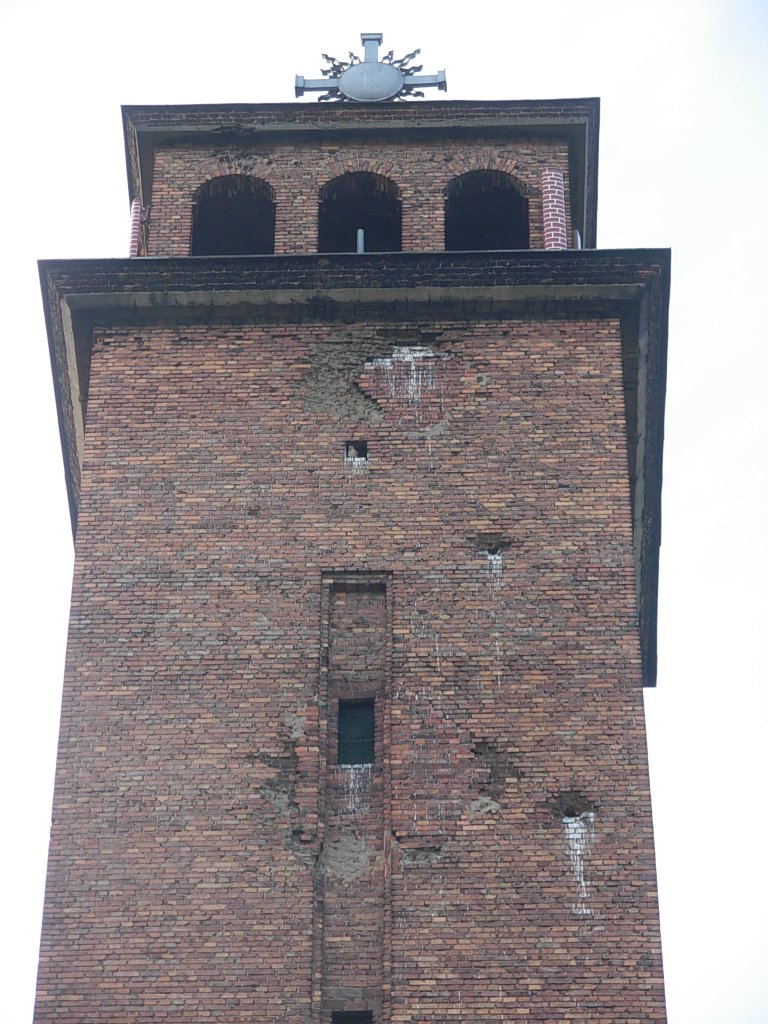
Detail of the steeple, still bearing some 1945 damages

=== Catholic church Saint Maximilian Kolbe, corner with Kolibrowa street ===
1982–1991

Modern architecture

Grunwaldzka street cuts through a patch of forest before entering another urban area where stands the church. A pastoral center has been active in this area since in 1970. One of its member, Jadwiga Woś, donated a swathe of her land to have a chapel built. A first service was celebrated there on March 9, 1972, for the ten following years. The parish St. Maximilian Kolbe was erected on July 1, 1981. The cornerstone of the church (coming from an ancient Roman temple on Lech Hill in Gniezno) was laid on May 25, 1983, in a ceremony attended among others by the Primate of Poland, Józef Glemp. On May 26, 1991, Cardinal Józef Glemp solemnly consecrated the new church in the Osowa Góra district.

The church is built in a modern style. On the main wall of the chancel one can admire a 7-m-high bronze bas-relief of the Parish Patron saint. The architectural structure also comprises catechetical rooms, a parish office and a daily chapel.

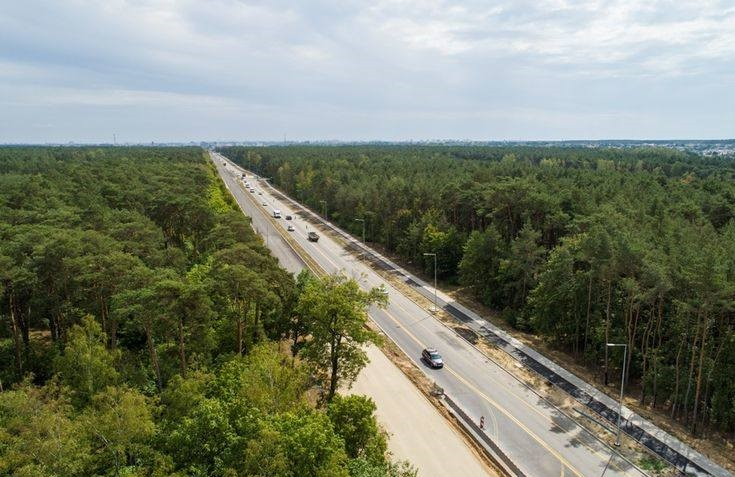
Grunwaldzka street through the forest before reaching the church

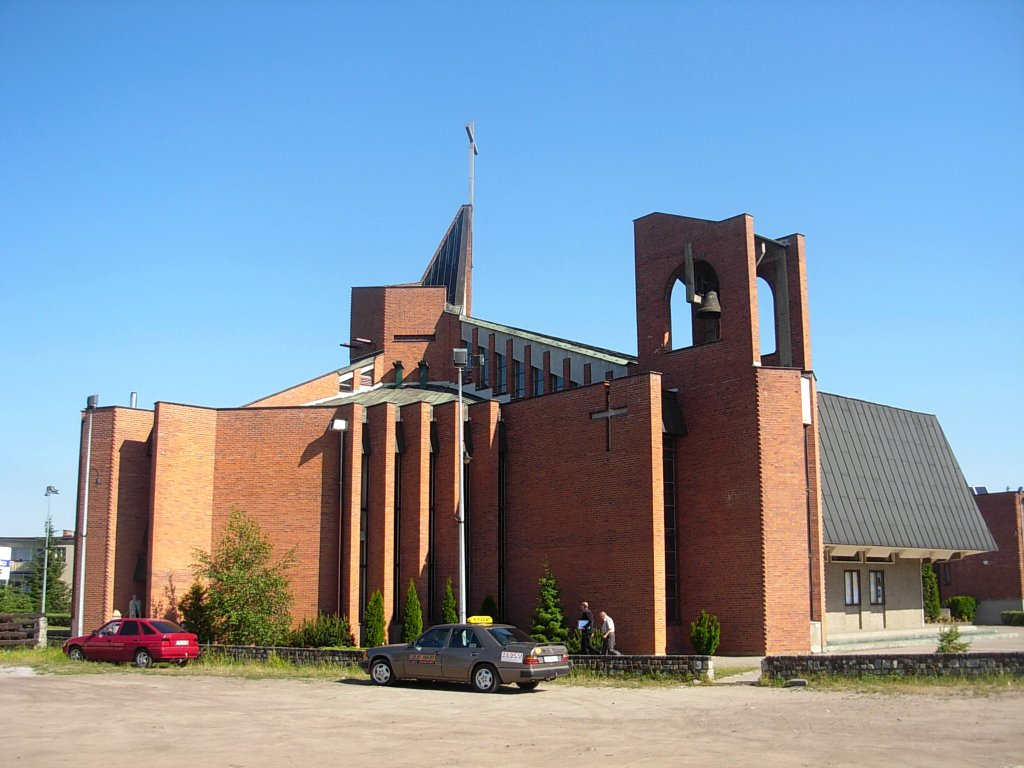
View of the church from the street

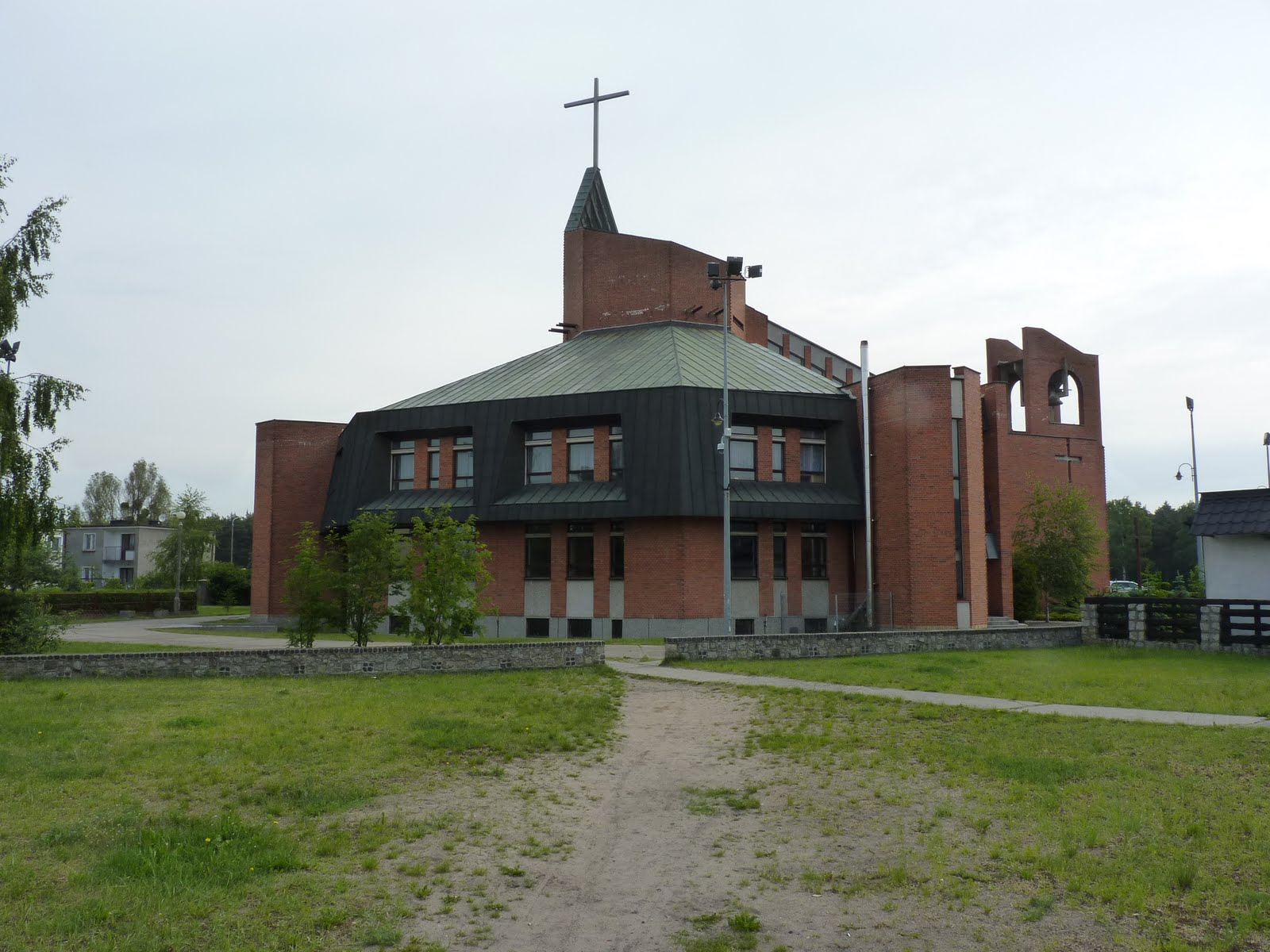
Northern view

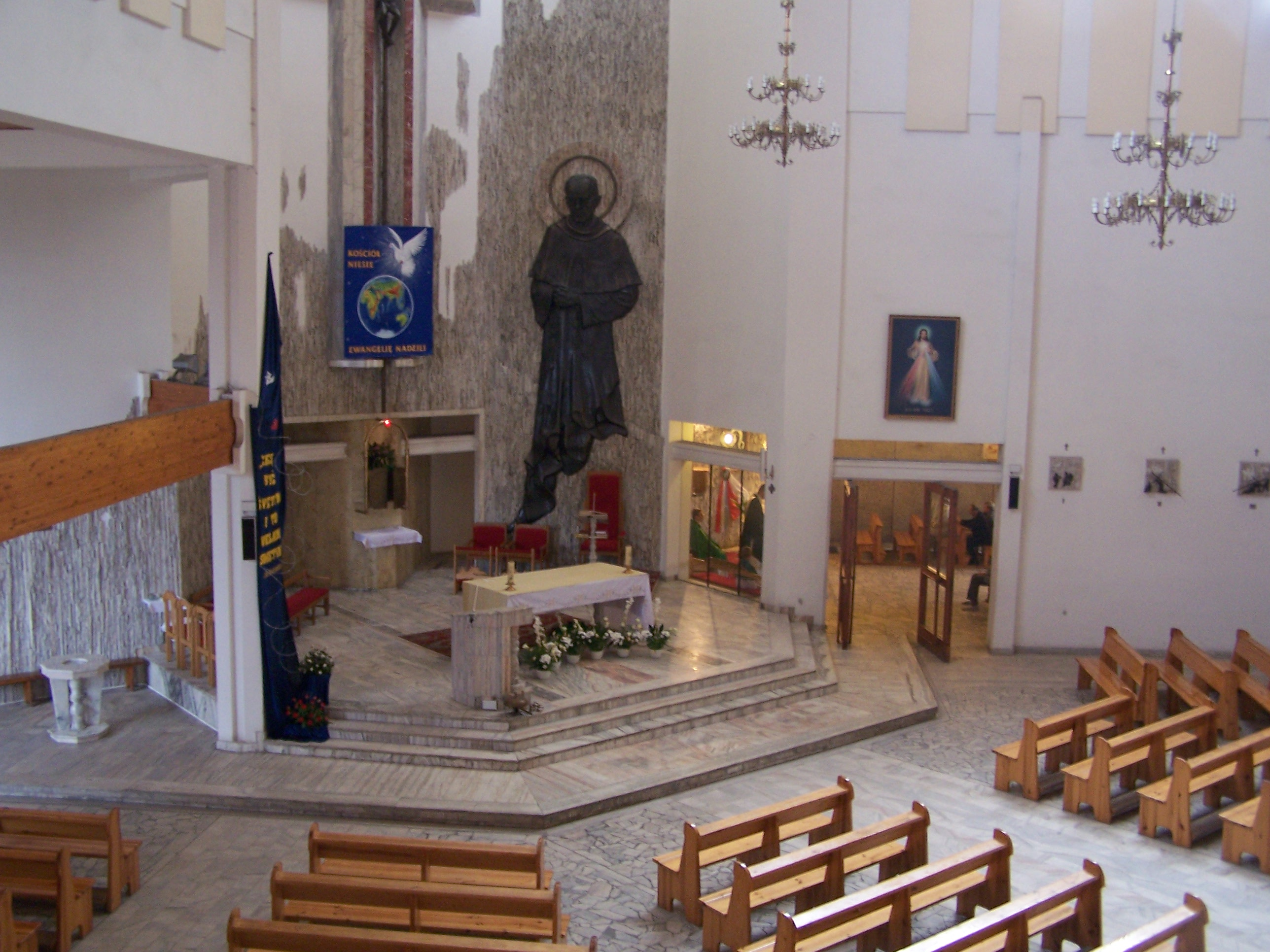
The chancel with the bas-relief

=== Restaurant Karczma Rzym ===
The last estate on Grunwaldzka street prior to leaving Bydgoszcz territory, is Karczma Rzym (English: Rome Inn), a traditional restaurant. It offers traditional Polish cuisine and bears a name widely spread in Poland for such an establishment .

Karczma Rzym alludes to Adam Mickiewicz's Pan Twardowski, where a sorcerer (Twardowski) sellshis soul to the devil in exchange for eternal life and special powers. However, Twardowski, willing to outwit the devil, includes a special clause in the contract, stating that Satan will own Twardowski's soul only if he visits Rome – a place the sorcerer never intends to go to. The devil's trick relied on luring the sorcerer into a newly built tavern called Rome Inn.

Legend has it that Pan Twardowski spent some time in Bydgoszcz, where, as a celebration as well as a touristic attraction, a figure was recently mounted in a window of a tenement, overseeing the Old Market square. Every day at 13:13 and 21:13, third storey window at Nr.15 opens and Pan Twardowski appears, accompanied by music and a devilish laughter. He takes a bow, waves his hand, and then disappears, to the delight of gathered spectators.

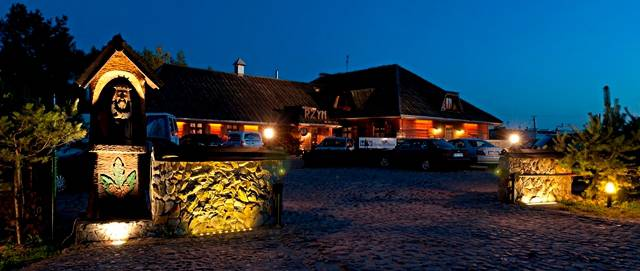
Restaurant Karczma Rzym

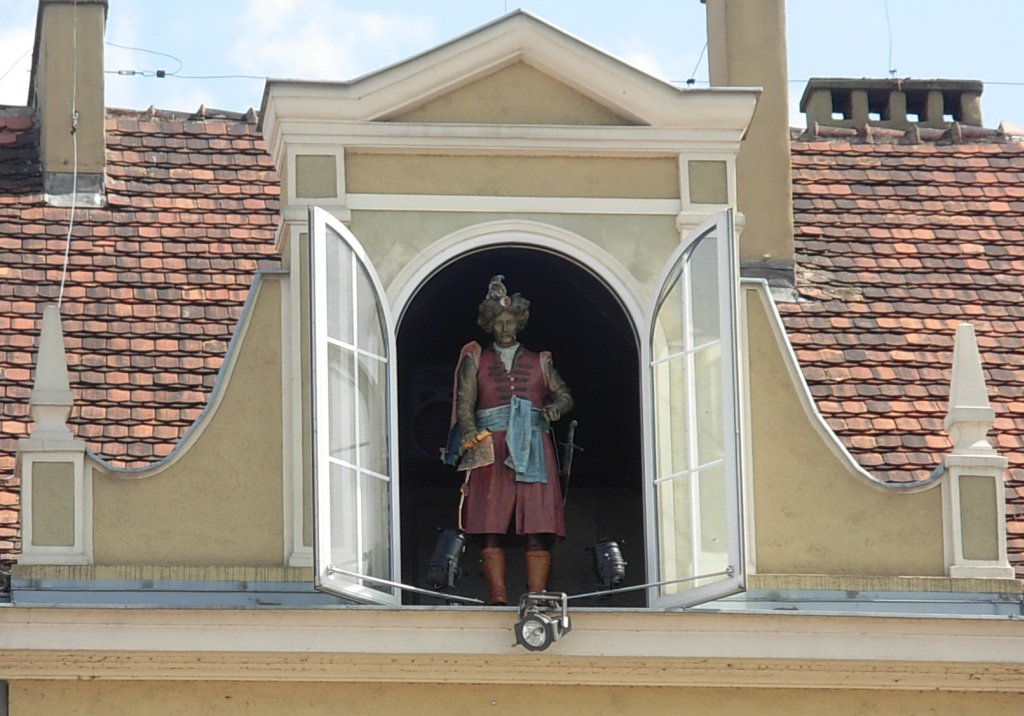
Pan Twardowski statue in Bydgoszcz

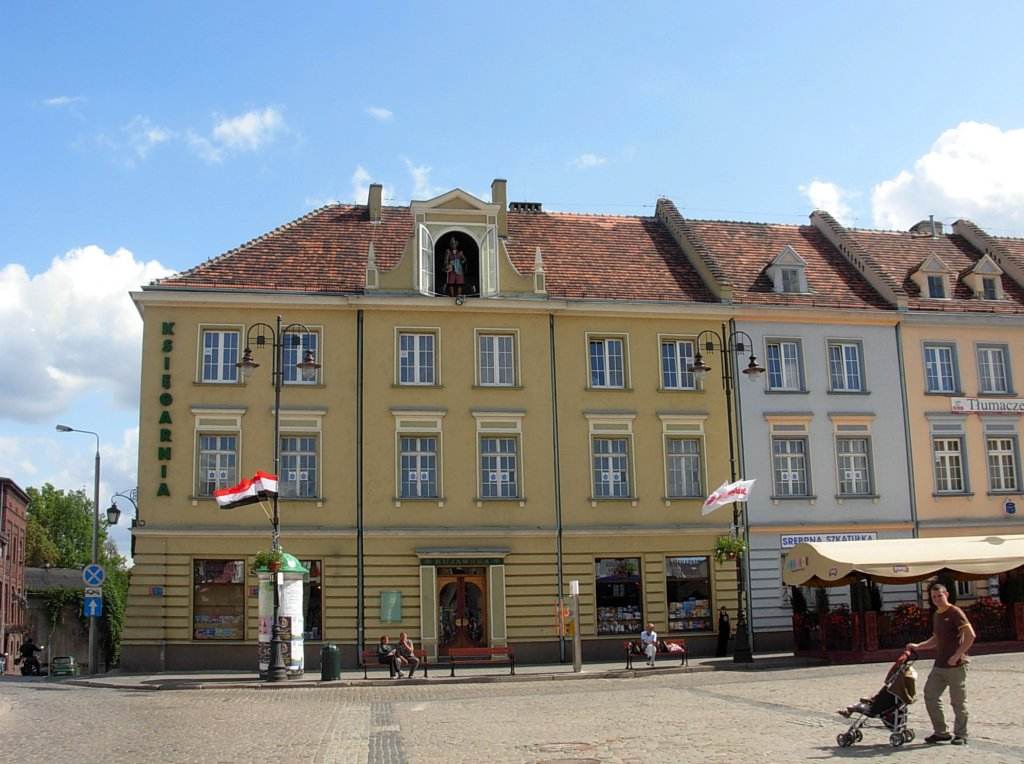
Nr.15 on Old Market Place

== See also ==
- Bydgoszcz
- Swiętej Trojcy street
- BELMA
- Pan Twardowski

== Bibliography ==
- Bręczewska-Kulesza, Daria (2004). Przegląd stylów występujących w bydgoskiej architekturze drugiej połowy XIX i początku XX stulecia. Bydgoszcz w stronę Okola (in Polish). Bydgoszcz: Zespół Pracowni Dokumentacji i Popularyzacji Zabytków Wojewódzkiego Ośrodka Kultury w Bydgoszczy. ISBN 83-921725-0-7.
- Czachorowski, Antoni (1997). Atlas historyczny miast polskich. Tom II Kujawy. Zeszyt I Bydgoszcz (in Polish). Toruń: Uniwersytet Mikołaja Kopernika.
- Derenda, Jerzy (2006). Piękna stara Bydgoszcz. Tom I z serii: Bydgoszcz miasto na Kujawach (in Polish). Bydgoszcz: Towarzystwo Miłośników Miasta Bydgoszczy. ISBN 83-916178-0-7.
- Jastrzębska-Puzowska, Iwona (2005). Od miasteczka do metropolii. Rozwój architektoniczny i urbanistyczny Bydgoszczy w latach 1850-1920 (in Polish). Toruń: Wydawnictwo MADO. ISBN 83-89886-38-3.
- Bydgoszcz w stronę Okola (in Polish). Bydgoszcz: Zespół Pracowni Dokumentacji i Popularyzacji Zabytków Wojewódzkiego Ośrodka Kultury w Bydgoszczy. 2004. ISBN 83-921725-0-7.
- Rogalski, Bogumił (1991). Architektura sakralna Bydgoszczy dawniej i dziś. Kronika Bydgoska XII (in Polish). Bydgoszcz: Towarzystwo Miłosnikow Miasta Bydgoszczy - Bydgoskie Towarzystwo Naukowe. pp. 51–77.
