= Upper Noteć Canals =

Waterway, canals, 1882, Kuyavian-Pomeranian Voivodeship, Poland

Coordinates: 52°58′25″N 17°58′13″E

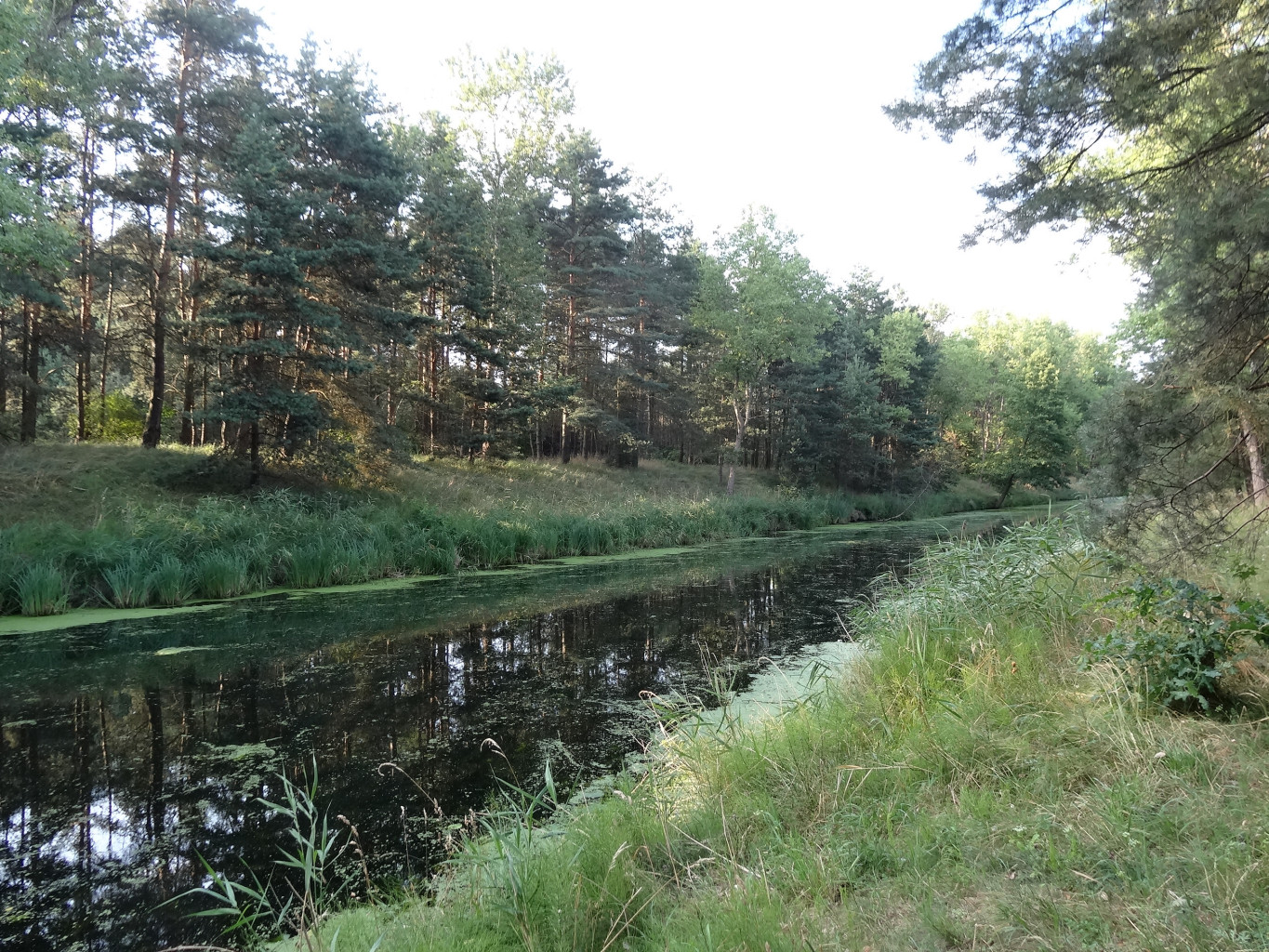
- View in the vicinity of Murowaniec

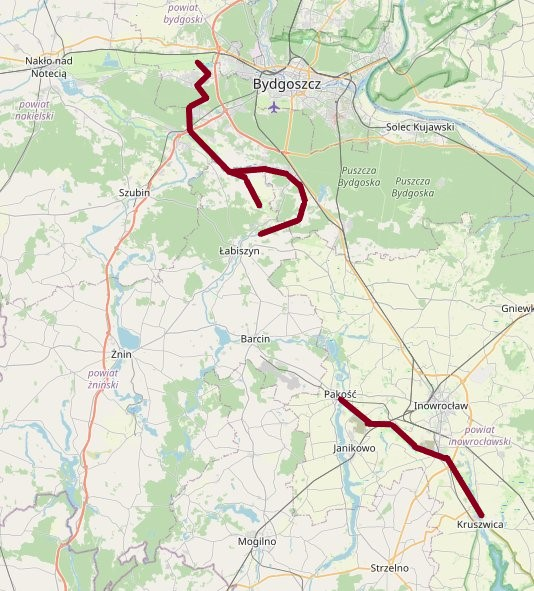
- Map of the main upper Noteć canals

Specifications
- Length: 115 km (71 miles)

History
- Former names: German: Speise Kanal, Neuer Netze Kanal, Bachorze Kanal
- Modern name: Polish: Kanały Górnonotecki, Nowy Kanał Notecki, Bachorze Kanał
- Construction began: 1772
- Date completed: 1882

Geography
- Start point: Noteć river at Dziarnowo, Poland
- End point: Bydgoszcz Canal at Łochowo, Poland
- Branch of: Noteć river
- Connects to: Bydgoszcz Canal

The Upper Noteć Canals are an aggregate of inland water channels in Kuyavian-Pomeranian Voivodeship, Poland. They stem from the upper part of the Noteć river (Górna Noteć), north of Gopło lake, and mouth at their northern point into the Bydgoszcz Canal, west of the city territory. These canals have been put into operation between the 1770s and the 1880s and are still partly navigable today.

== Location ==
The canals routes find their way through an ancient valley about 2 km wide, surrounded by steep edges:

- on the north, the Krajeńskie Lake District banks are 25 to 40 m high;
- on the south, the upper slopes of Toruń basin are 10 to 15 m high.

The area was created about 12,000 years ago by a divide between the basins of Oder and Vistula rivers.

This network of inland water channels comprises mainly:

- the "Notecki canal" (Polish: Kanał Notecki), from the northern tip of the Gopło lake to the village of Pakość and from the hamlet of Nowe Dąbie to the Bydgoszcz Canal, about 2.5 kilometres (1.6 mi) west of the sluice Nr.6 of Osowa Góra, in the village of Łochowo;
- the "New Notecki canal" (Polish: Nowy Kanał Notecki), from Nowe Dąbie to the east of the hamlet of Dębinek, where it merges with the Noteć river bed;
- the "Kanał Bachorze", from Kruszwica to the Zgłowiączka river, a tributary of the Vistula;
- the "Stary Rów" water way ("Old ditch") near Inowrocław.

== Main canals ==
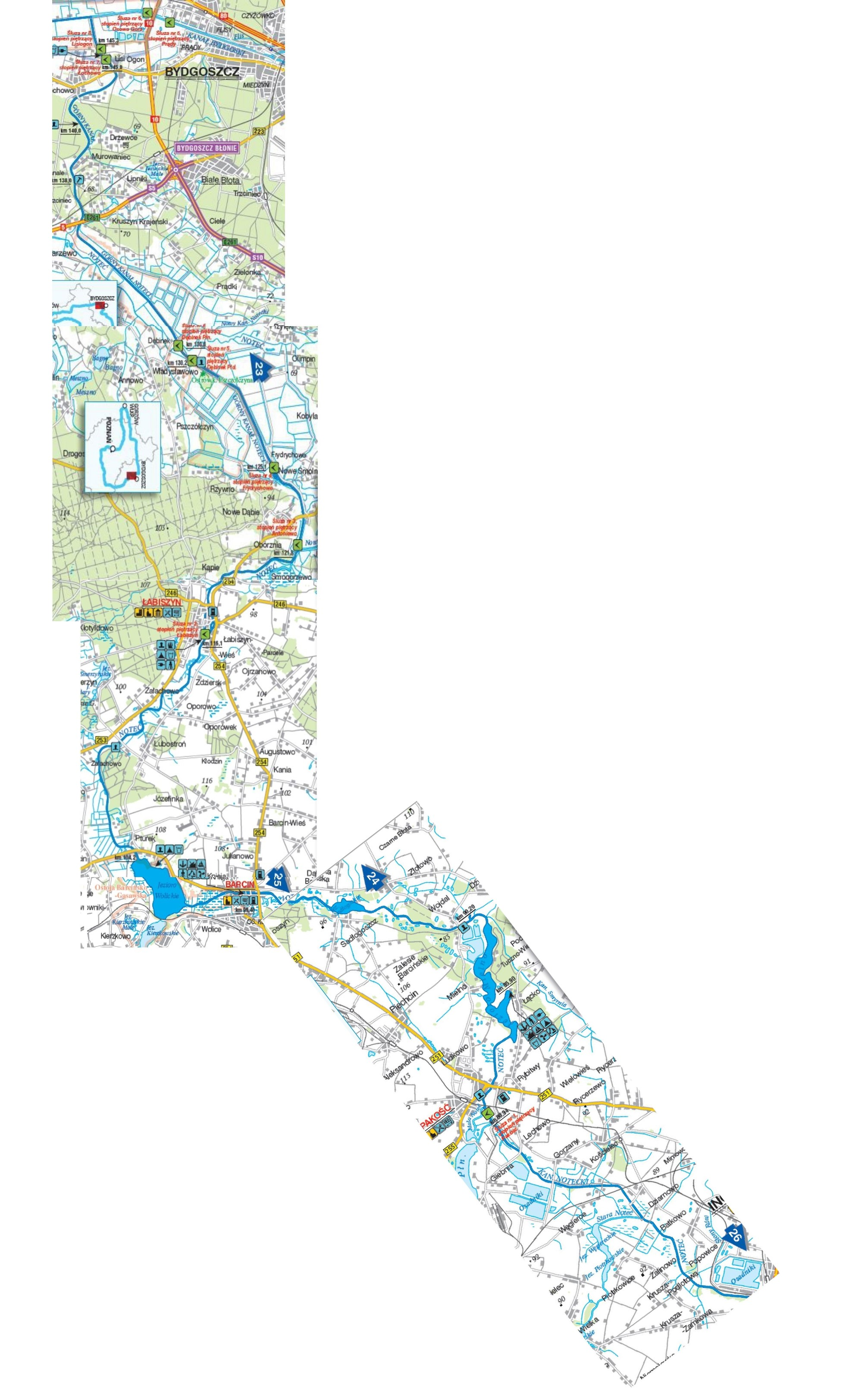
Map of the upper Noteć region and its canals

In 1774, a first canal had been dug as part of the overall Bydgoszcz Canal project. Its path ran from the Noteć river at the level of Dębinek hamlet to the Bydgoszcz Canal, between the locks of Osowa Góra and Józefinki (near Nakło nad Notecią). It now makes up the lower part of the Górnonotecki canal (English: Upper Noteć canal). Widened and deepened at the beginning of the 19th century, it could then provision Noteć water to the Bydgoszcz Canal.

At the time of their inception, these canals brought an economic boost to Kuyavia and Greater Poland areas, by connecting Oder and Vistula through the Noteć river. Furthermore, the canal network became an essential piece of the "Bydgoszcz Water Junction" which linked two water routes: the "Vistula route" (from then Congress Poland to the Baltic Sea) and the "Bydgoszcz Canal" route leading to Szczecin and Berlin.

The economic importance of those waterways waned gradually after World War II. In addition, the discontinuation of the systematic dredging and cleaning works in the 1980s amplified their poor condition and impacted negatively the traffic: while about 530 ships sailed through the channels in 1959, there were 360 ones in 1980 and only 12 in 1990.

A thorough renovation project was launched in 2020.

=== Notecki canal ("Górnonotecki kanał") ===
The initial designs of this canal date back to the first half of the 19th century, as a solution to the recurring floods damaging the meadows along the Noteć river (1807, 1830). Worried that the works could lower the water level of the nearby Gopło lake and reduce the water supply for the Bydgoszcz Canal, the Prussian authorities kept delaying the required investment for a long time. Eventually, in 1857–1859, local private companies started to work on the boggy lowlands around the Gopło lake and the Noteć meadows. Official Prussian plans about the draining system of the upper Noteć river, from the Gopło lake to the Bydgoszcz canal, were only detailed in the 1870s.

On September 25, 1882, this canalised route was opened. It was 105 km long, of which over 30 km used the newly dug channel, thus avoiding the winding riverbed. The new path bypassed the river at Leszczyc hamlet and led to the village of Pakość. Besides, the water supply route channel from Dębinek to the mouth of the Bydgoszcz Canal was deepened and adapted for navigation, allowing navigation for ships up to 150 tons.

In 1879, the powiats of Inowrocław and Mogilno requested to the government to have the Pakoskie and Bronisławskie lakes included in the sewage system of the Noteć River. As a result, the Prussian authorities launched the project to link the lakes with a 3 kilometres (1.9 mi) ditch. In later years, further works allowed the linking up of the "Żnińskie Lakes" (Kierzkowskie, Ostrowieckie, Foluskie lakes), to the upper Noteć river by the addition of two locks in Wójcin and Ostrowiec and the creation of a 112 kilometres (70 mi) long navigable channel(1905).

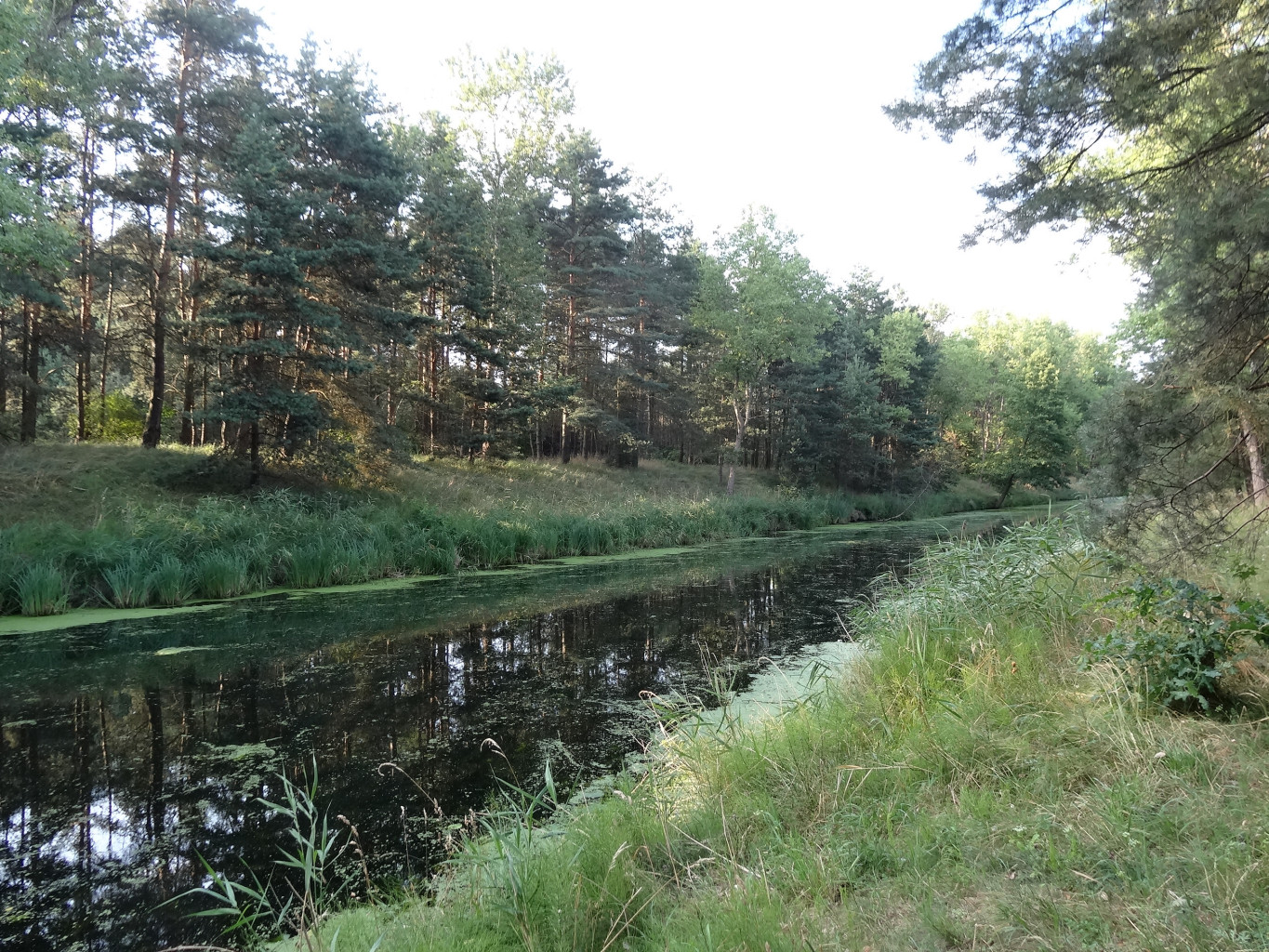
GornoNotecki Canal in Murowaniec

=== New Notecki canal ("Nowy Kanał Notecki" or "Nowonotecki Kanał ") ===
The new Notecki Canal was established in the 19th century, as a result of many years of work aiming at regulating the water flow in the upper Noteć valley: indeed, before its construction, the uncontrolled river bed winded from Łabiszyn through Brzoza to Rynarzewo in a sweeping arc, regularly flooding the vicinity of its meanders.

Already during the construction of the Bydgoszcz Canal in 1774, a supply water course had been laid, branching from the Noteć river to Lisi Ogon, bypassing Rynarzewo. The completion of melioration plans, started in the 1890s, was interrupted by the upcoming WWI.

Facing the inactivity of the Prussian authorities, Count Fryderyk Skórzewski, owner of the nearby Lubostroń Palace funded the first regulation works on the Noteć river and the supply canal which flowed through his estate. As a result, in 1825, a narrow ditch bypassed the great bend of the Noteć, closed by two sluices,"Antoniewo" and "Frydrychowo": it was called the "Kanał Łabiszyński" ("Łabiszyn Canal"). In 1860, two companies were established to tackle the issue of water flow in the upper and middle sections of the Noteć river: "Spółka Okręgowa Melioracyjna Pakosko-Łabiszyńska" ("Pakosko-Łabiszyńska Regional Melioration Company) and "Spółka Okręgowa Melioracyjna Bydgosko-Łabiszyszyńska". In the 1860s and 1870s, the Noteć riverbed was straighten up at the level of Łabiszyn and the upper valley of the river, once considered as very marshy, was gradually drained: peat and swamps eventually gave way to meadows and pastures.

In the 1870s, the Prussian authorities adapted the lock at Dębinek: a water distribution junction was created, receiving water from the Górnonotecki and the New Notecki Canals, regulating their flow both towards the Bydgoszcz Canal and the riverbed of the Noteć towards Rynarzewo.

Nowadays, the Nowonotecki Canal provides irrigation water to the villages of Prądki, Przyłęki and Brzoza, covering approx. 1,813 hectares (4,480 acres). There are 10 permanent hydrotechnical structures on the canal: 9 culverts and 1 weir.

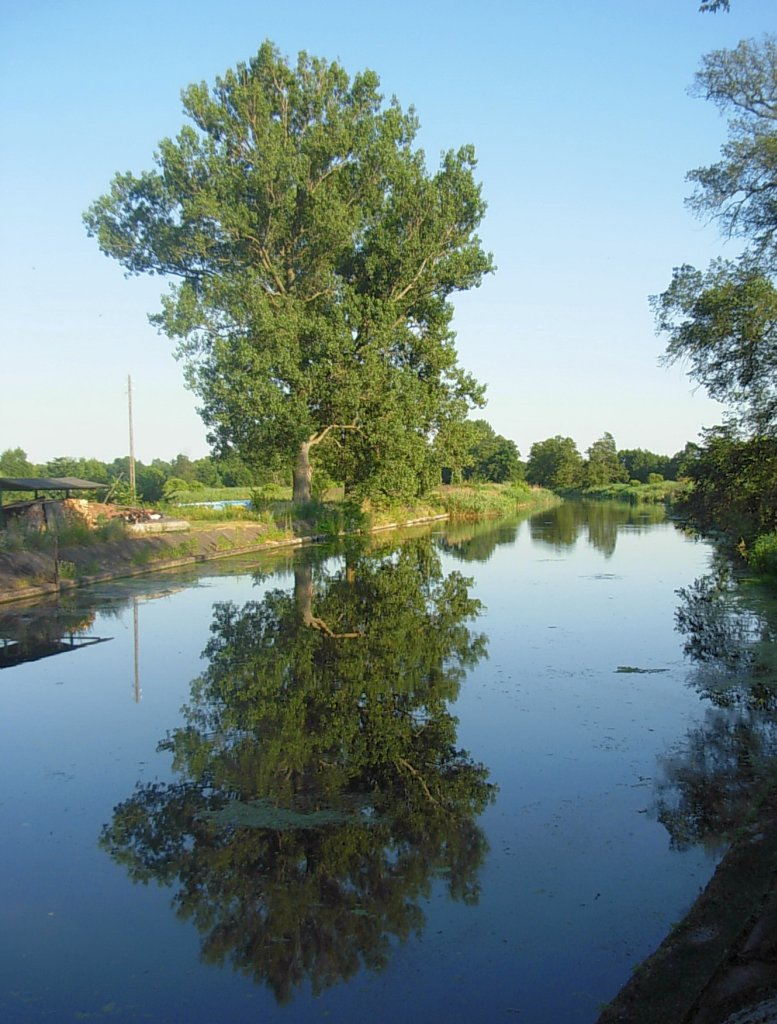
Górnonotecki Kanał at Dębinek

=== Bachorze Canals ("Kanały Bachorze") ===
The oldest mention of these waterways date back to 1297. During the reign of king Przemysł II, the canal was used by "Korabnicy", a class of the population in charge of the production of flat-bottomed ship (Polish: korabi) for the benefit of the ducal court. The hamlet of "Bachorze" was a settlement of Korabnicy who carried out the crossing of this shallow swampy area mouthing into the Zgłowiączka. The area of "Bachorze" (today's Kobylniki, north of Kruszwica) was then completely flooded during the spring season.

In this place, local rulers ordered works on the deepening of the small rivers flowing there, in order to enable navigation throughout the year. The aim was to connect Vistula and Warta-Oder river basins, as the distance to be covered (from Gopło lake to the Vistula) was rather short (ca 40 kilometres (25 mi)) and the area was flat and wet.

The current canal was created after the drainage operations carried out in the middle of the 19th century: the first works were undertaken in 1836, with a following main effort in July–August 1855. Beside the main channel, branching of the lake, a smaller one ("Kanał Bachorze Małe") runs on a parallel course to the north, branching of the Noteć riverbed.

This 46 kilometres (29 mi) long channel has the specificity to cross the watershed between Vistula and Oder drainage basins. Hence its waters in the western and eastern ends flow in two opposite directions. The western arm flows into the Gopło lake, as one of its largest tributaries, while the eastern arm flows into the Zglowiączka river, a tributary of the Vistula river.

== Characteristics ==
The canal system aims are threefold:

- supplying water from the Noteć and Gopło Lake to the Bydgoszcz Canal;
- regulating the Noteć river flow in its upper branch;
- allowing a connection of the Kuyavian and Greater Poland lakes, thus connecting Vistula and Oder waterways.

It is the last section of the waterway "Warta-Bydgoszcz Canal". The length of the entire system (Noteć-Gopło to Bydgoszcz Canal) is 114.6 kilometres (71.2 mi). The Górnonotecki canal is classified as a class Ia navigable waterway, with up to 150 tons ships allowed. The navigable route is 15 to 20 m wide and is marked with coastal shipping signs. The water depth in the Górnonotecki canal ranges from 0.80 metres (2.6 ft) to 1.20 metres (3.9 ft) depending on the damming level. The navigation period is from April to November.

A renovation program of the water works on the Lower and Upper canalised Noteć river started in 2020: early that year the sluice N.8 at Lisi Ogon was rehabilitated. The scope of the PLN-2.17-million overhaul comprised, among others, the partial replacement of brick facade in the lock chamber, the repair of the bottom plate, upper and lower gates with manual mechanical drives, the upgrade of platforms and control devices.

This work was followed in the summer of 2020, by the renovation of the lock N. 7 in Łochowo. This project, with a budget of more than PLN 1.8 million, included replacing the bricks inside the chamber and on the eastern wall, renovating the upper head of the airlock while dismantling the gate drive mechanism. In addition, works allowed the modernization of the platforms, the control devices and the pedestrian paths.

=== Locks ===
The Upper Noteć Canal network has eight locks, built on the same pattern: a single-chamber device with dimensions of 42 metres (138 ft) × 5 metres (16 ft) made of concrete, bricks and stone blocks. Inside the chamber, water level drop reaches 13.68 metres (44.9 ft) towards the Bydgoszcz Canal. Each lock is equipped with a weir designed to drain excess water coming from the Noteć river across the canal.

Sluices on the Notecki Canals:

Name	Lock Nr. on waterway	Localisation, remarks	Position (km) on the waterway	Water level height	Waterway supplied
Pakość Lock (1878–1882)	1	Near the city of Pakość, next to the branching with the "Mała Noteć" coming from the Pakoskie Lake.	80,94 km	1,84 m	Noteć river
Łabiszyn Lock (1878–1882)	2	In the city center of Łabiszyn.	116,08 km	2,39 m	Noteć river
Antoniewo Lock (1882)	3	Near the village of Antoniewo. Named after Count Skórzewski's wife, Antonina, née Garczyński. In 1997, a 70-kW water power plant has been installed.	121,7 km	1,58 m	Noteć river
Frydrychowo Lock	4	Near the village of Antoniewo. Named after Count Fryderyk Skórzewski.	125,1 km	3,02 m	Noteć river
Dębinek I Lock (South)	5	Near the village of Dębinek, south of the junction of the canal with the Noteć.	130,1 km	1,73 m	Noteć river
Dębinek II Lock (North)	6	Near the village of Dębinek, north of the junction of the canal with the Noteć.	130,7 km	0,83 m	Bydgoszcz canal
Łochowo Lock	7	Between the villages of Lisi Ogon and Łochowo.	144,9 km	3,10 m	Bydgoszcz canal
Lisi Ogon Lock	8	Between the villages of Lisi Ogon and Łochowo. 300m downstream of lock 7.	145,3 km	3,17 m	Bydgoszcz canal

== Gallery ==
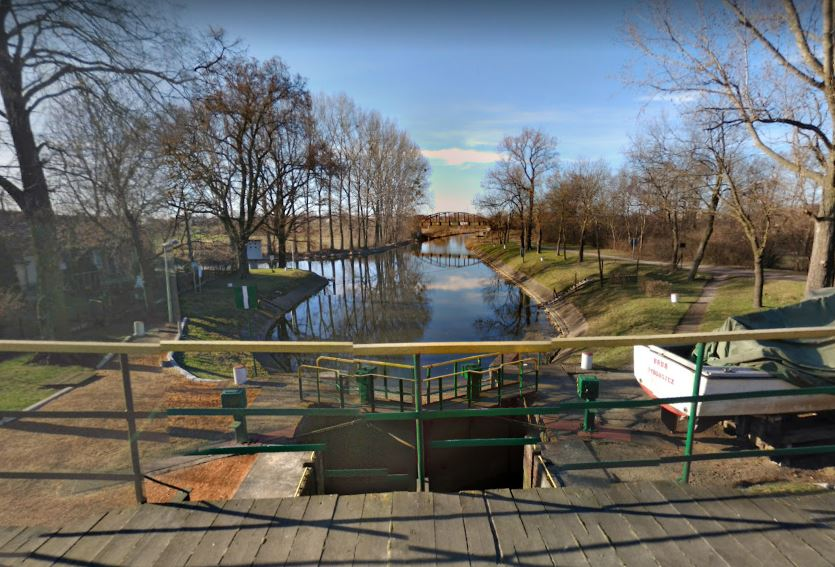
Sluice 1 at Pakość

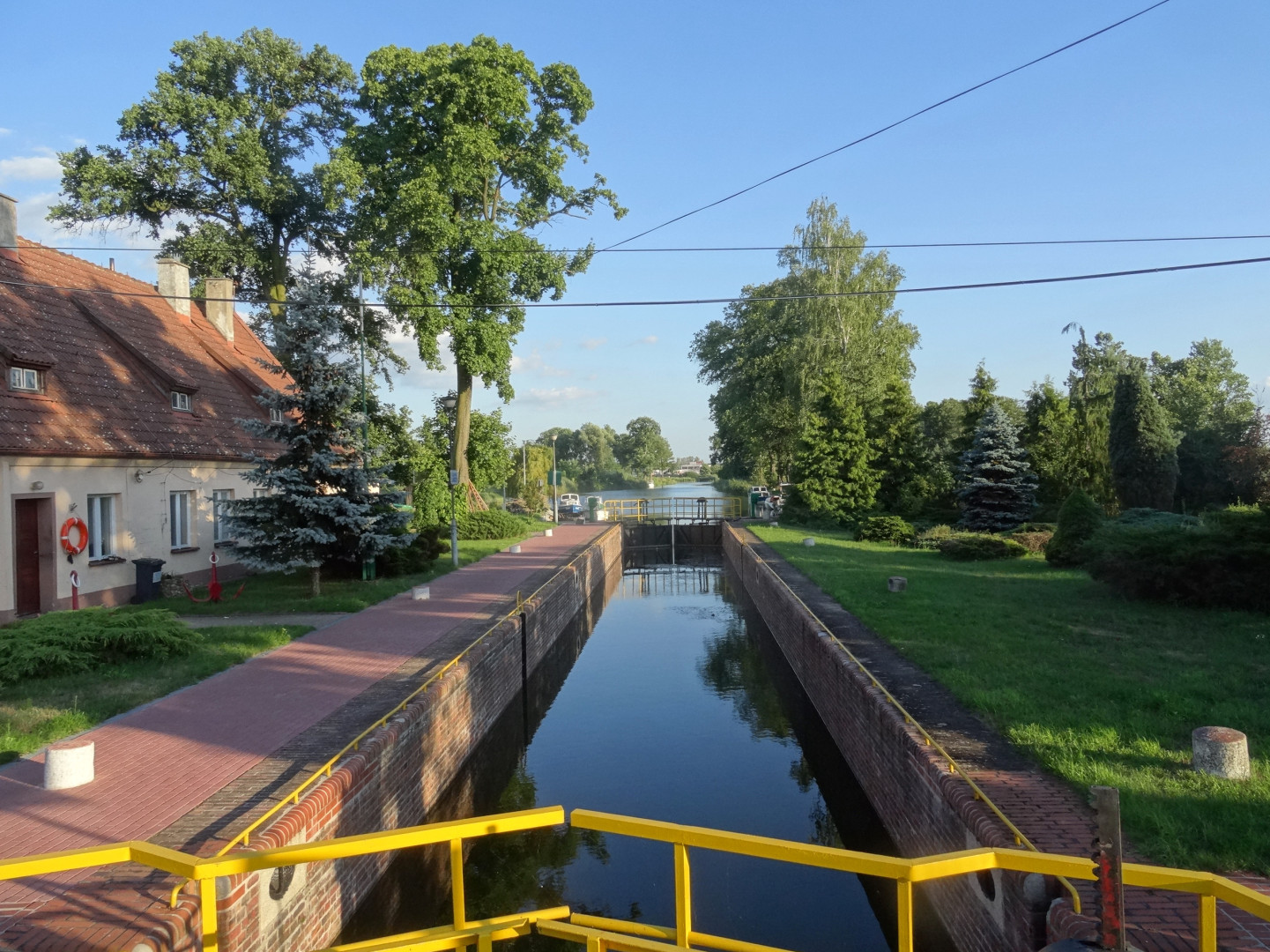
Sluice 2 at Łabiszyn

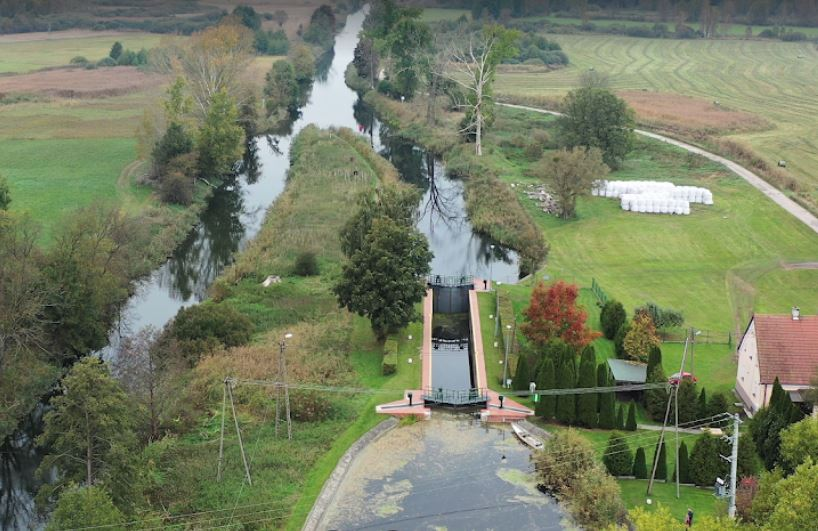
Sluice 3 at Antoniewo

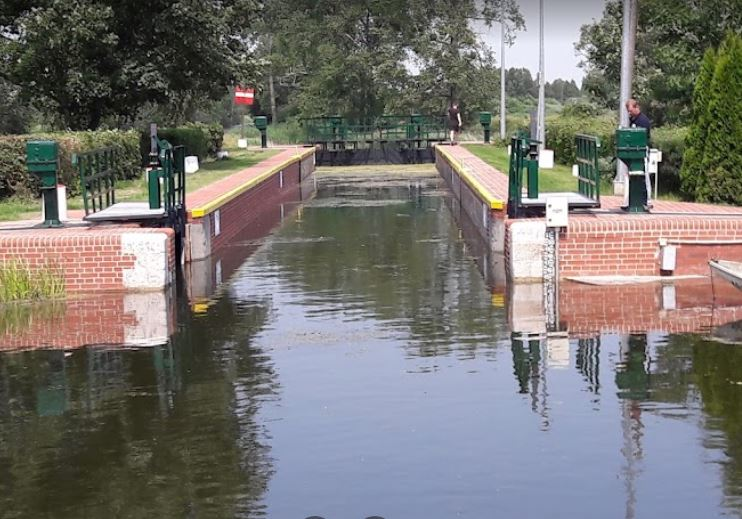
Sluice 4 at Frydrychowo

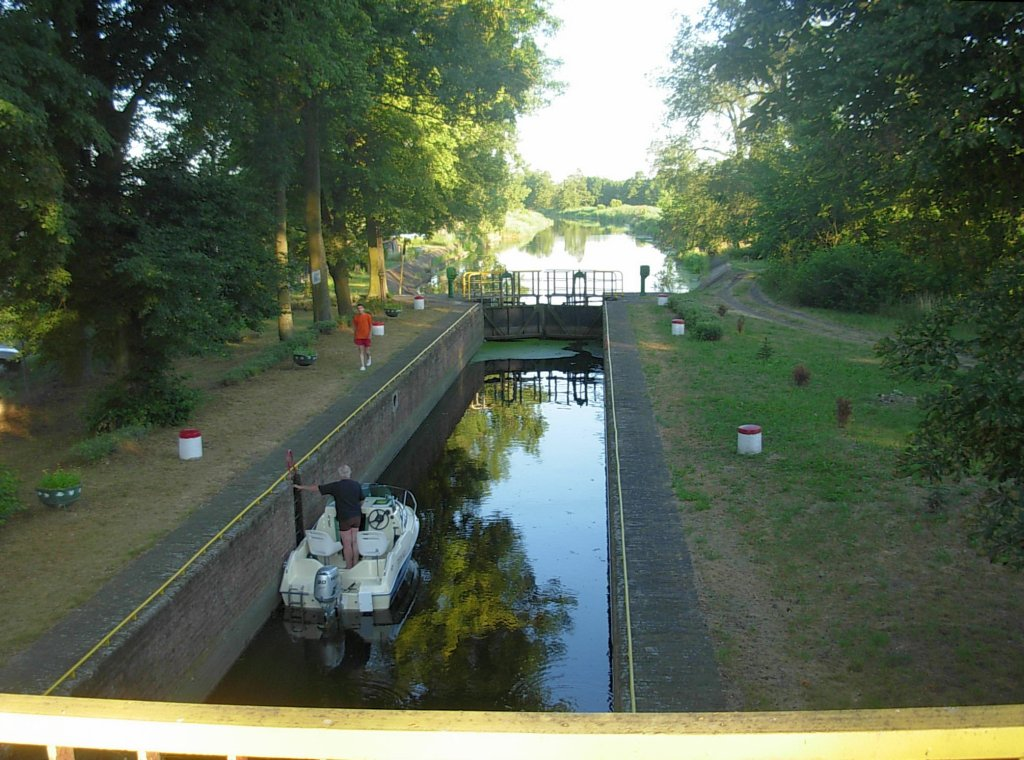
Sluice at Dębinek

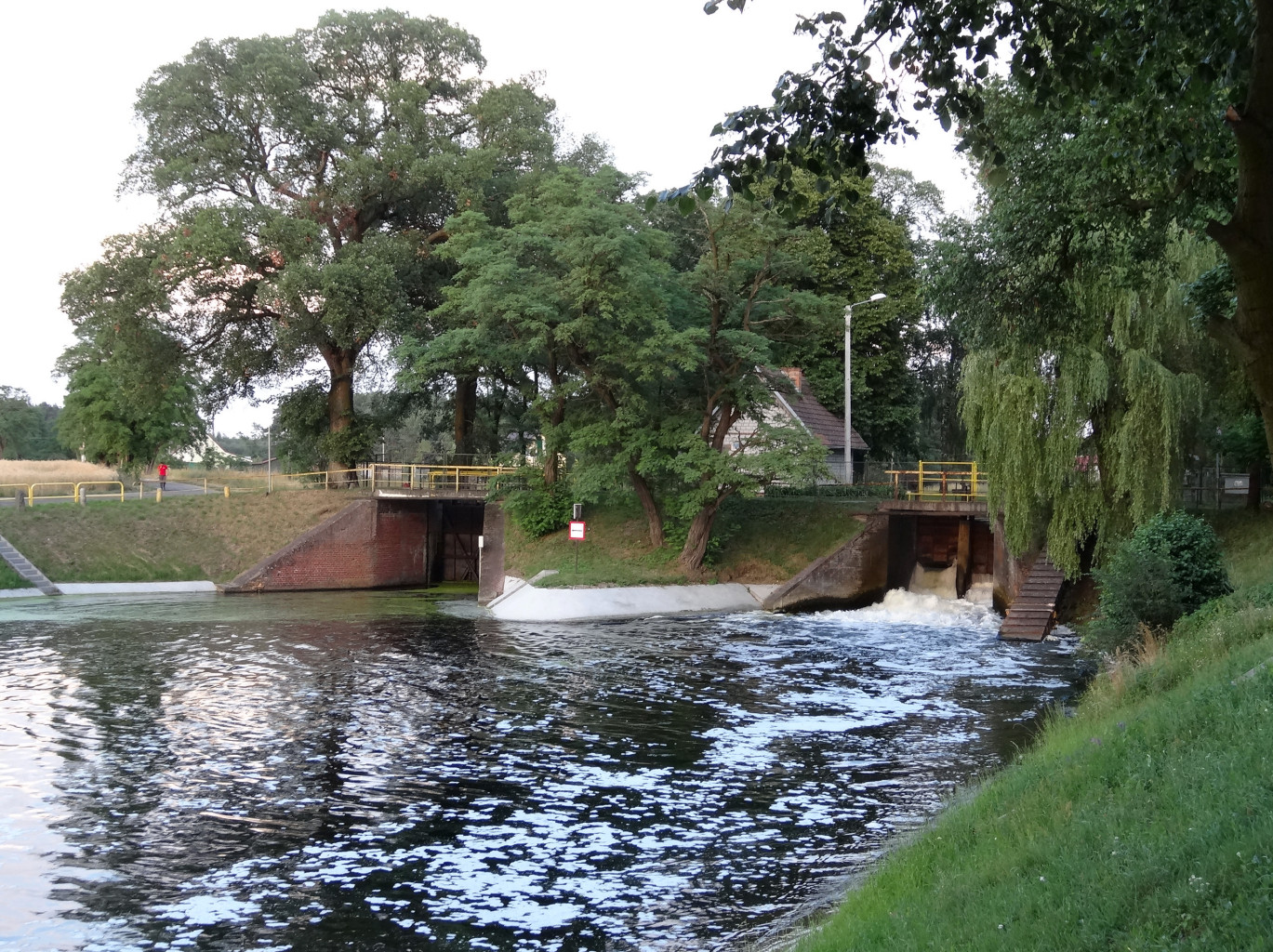
Sluice 7 at Łochowo

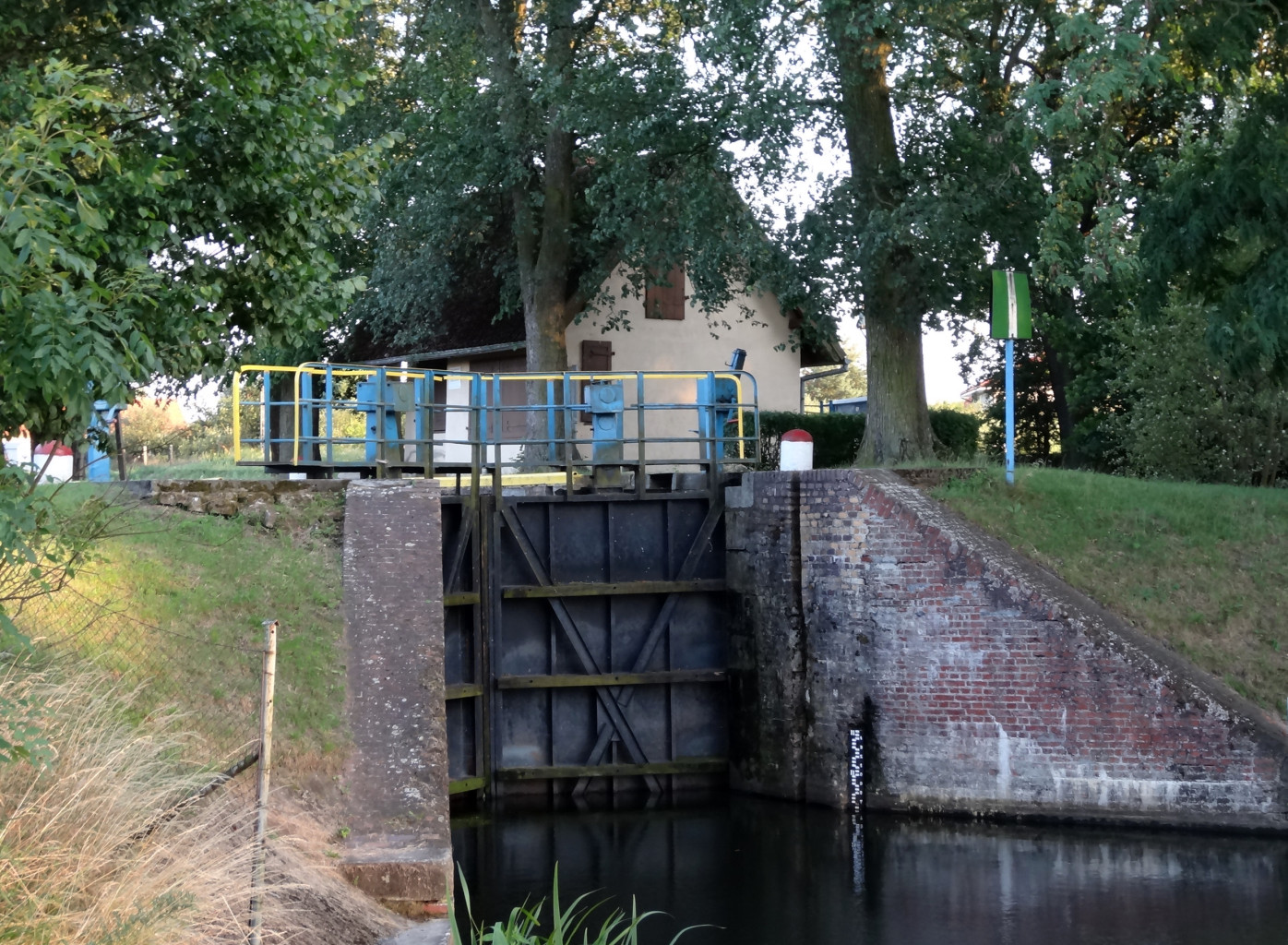
Sluice 8 at Lisi Ogon

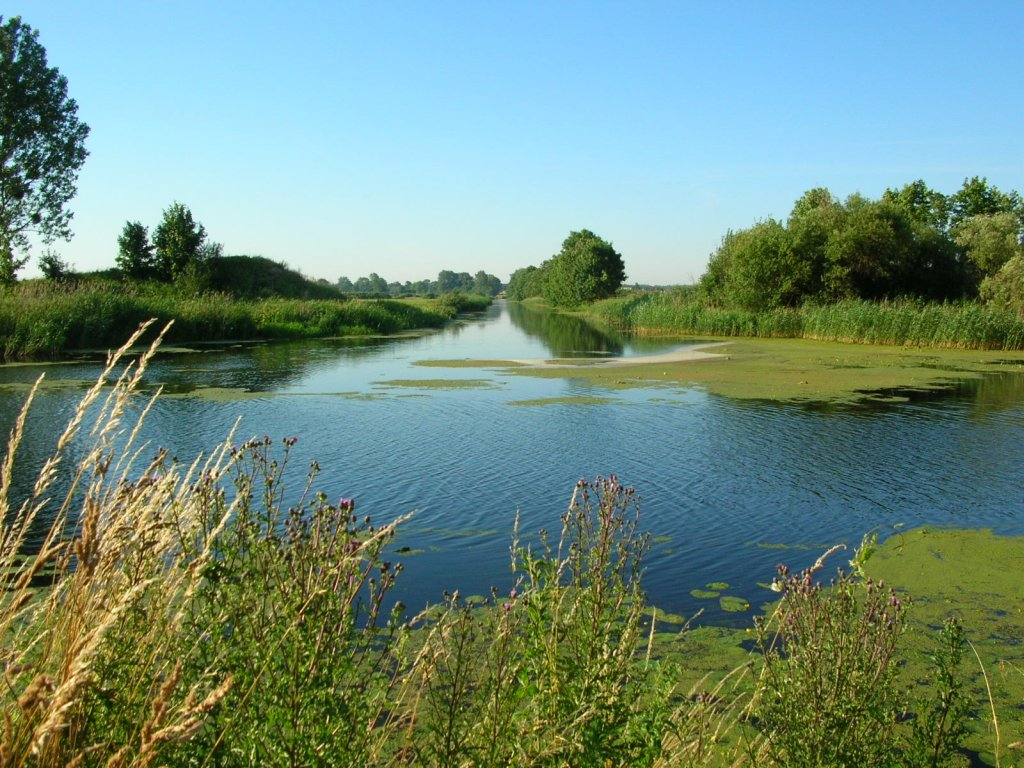
Mouth of the Notecki canal into the Bydgoszcz Canal

== See also ==
- Bydgoszcz
- Bydgoszcz Canal
- Lubostroń Palace
- Canal
- Brda river
- Noteć river

== Bibliography ==
- (in Polish) Woźniak-Hlebionek, Agnieszka (2002). Kanał Bydgoski, Brda i Noteć w pruskich planach inwestycyjnych w latach 1773–1915. Kronika Bydgoska XXIII. Bydgoszcz: Towarzystwo Miłosnikow Miasta Bydgoszczy - Bydgoskie Towarzystwo Naukowe. pp. 135–144.
- (in Polish) Sobecki, Włodzimierz (2002). Kanał Bydgoski i Kanał Górnonotecki :historia budowy przełomowej dla rozwoju regionu nadnoteckiego, m. in. Łochowa w gminie Białe Błota i okolicy. Łochowo. ISBN 8392286162.
- (in Polish) Grabarska, Jadwiga (2014). Kanał Bydgoski. Zestawienie bibliograficzne adnotowane opracowane na podstawie wydawnictw zwartych i artykułów z czasopism oraz wydawnictw ciągłych dostępnych w Pedagogicznej Bibliotece Wojewódzkiej im. Mariana Rejewskiego w Bydgoszczy (PDF). Bydgoszcz.
