= Saint Anthony of Padua Church, Bydgoszcz =

Catholic Church, Bydgoszcz, Poland

Coordinates: 53°08′17″N 17°57′46″E

Saint Anthony of Padua Church
- Polish: Kościół św. Antoniego Padewskiego w Bydgoszczy
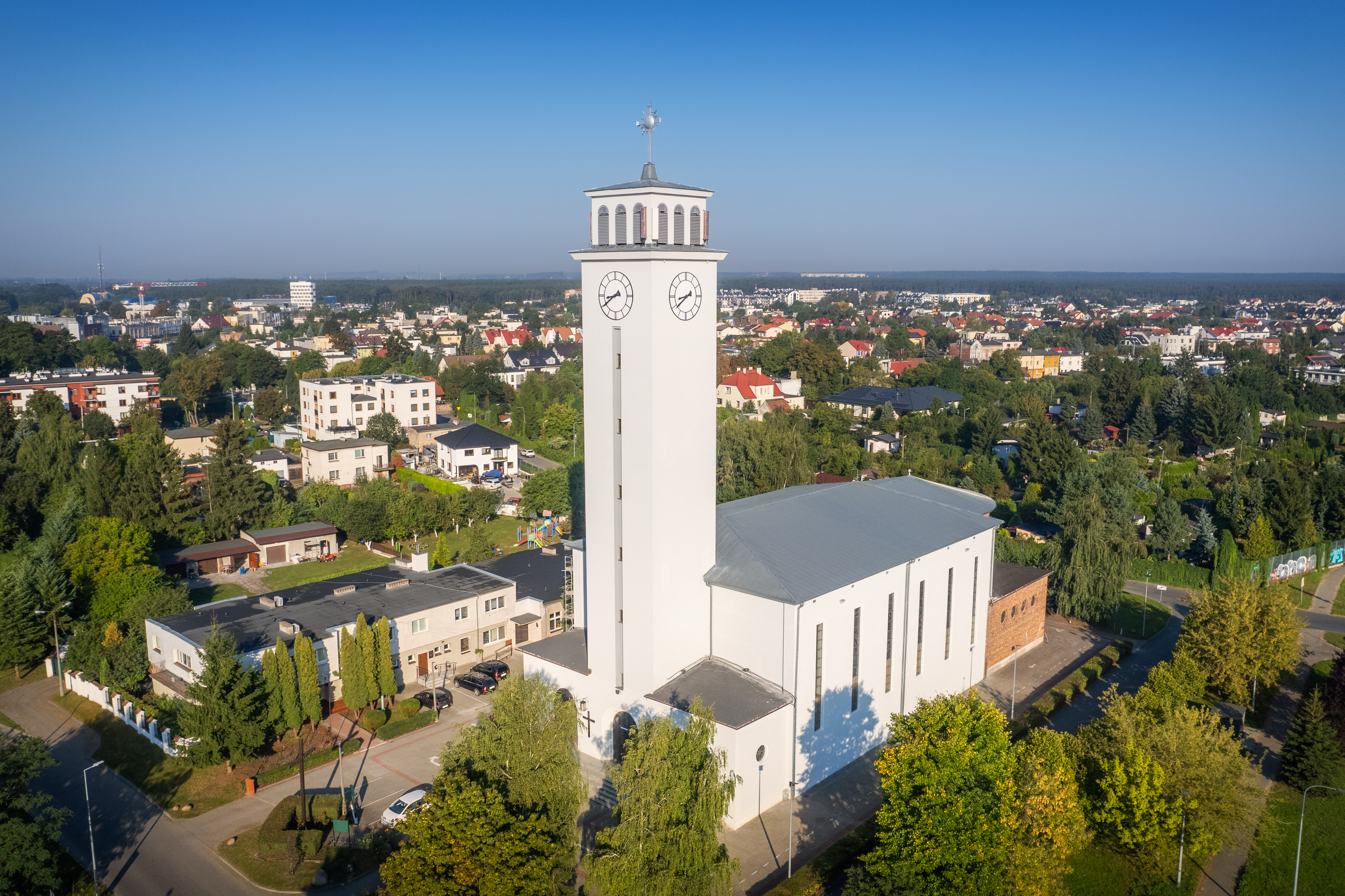
- Saint Anthony of Padua Church, Bydgoszcz
- Saint Anthony of Padua Church
- Location: 15 Głucha street, Bydgoszcz
- Country: Poland
- Denomination: Catholic Church
- Website: Bydgoszcz St Anthony parish

History
- Status: Church
- Dedication: Saint Anthony of Padua
- Dedicated: 1 December 1945

Architecture
- Functional status: Active
- Heritage designation: Nr.A/1159, 3 August 2006
- Architect: Stefan Cybichowski
- Architectural type: Modernism
- Completed: 1945

Specifications
- Materials: Brick, concrete

Saint Anthony of Padua Church is a catholic church in the Polish city of Bydgoszcz, dedicated to Saint Anthony of Padua. It is located at 3 Głucha Street, in the western district of Czyżkówko in Bydgoszcz, Poland. It has been registered on the Pomeranian Heritage List.

== History ==
=== Interwar period ===
In 1920, when the commune of Czyżkówko got incorporated into the city of Bydgoszcz, the question of erecting a Catholic church in this new district was raised. Initially, Czyżkówko belonged to the parish of the Church of the Holy Trinity, however, both the relatively large distance to the church and the increase in the population of the district were issues to be addressed by building a new church locally. As a result, a Church Construction Committee (Polish: Komitet Budowy Kościoła) was established in early 1923: it was seated at present day 3 Koronowska street and aimed at converting the local dance hall located there into a chapel, which happened in November 1923. The building was consecrated on 24 February 1924, by Father Tadeusz Skarbek-Malczewski. From this moment on, services were held there on Sundays and holidays as well as processions (e.g. Corpus Christi celebration).

In 1929, the Church Building Committee requested the Archbishop's Curia to establish a new parish in Czyżkówko. This petition was answered by Primate August Hlond: on 1 July 1933, he authorised the erection of a new parish under the Patron saint of Anthony of Padua, separated from the Holy Trinity community.

The newly created body comprised around 6500 people and its territory covered not only city western settlements (Czyżkówko, Medzyń), but also suburban villages:

- Prądy;
- Drzewce;
- Łochowo;
- Łochowice;
- Lisi Ogon;
- Osowa Góra;
- Opławiec;
- Smukała.

The first parish priest was Father Jan Baranowski.

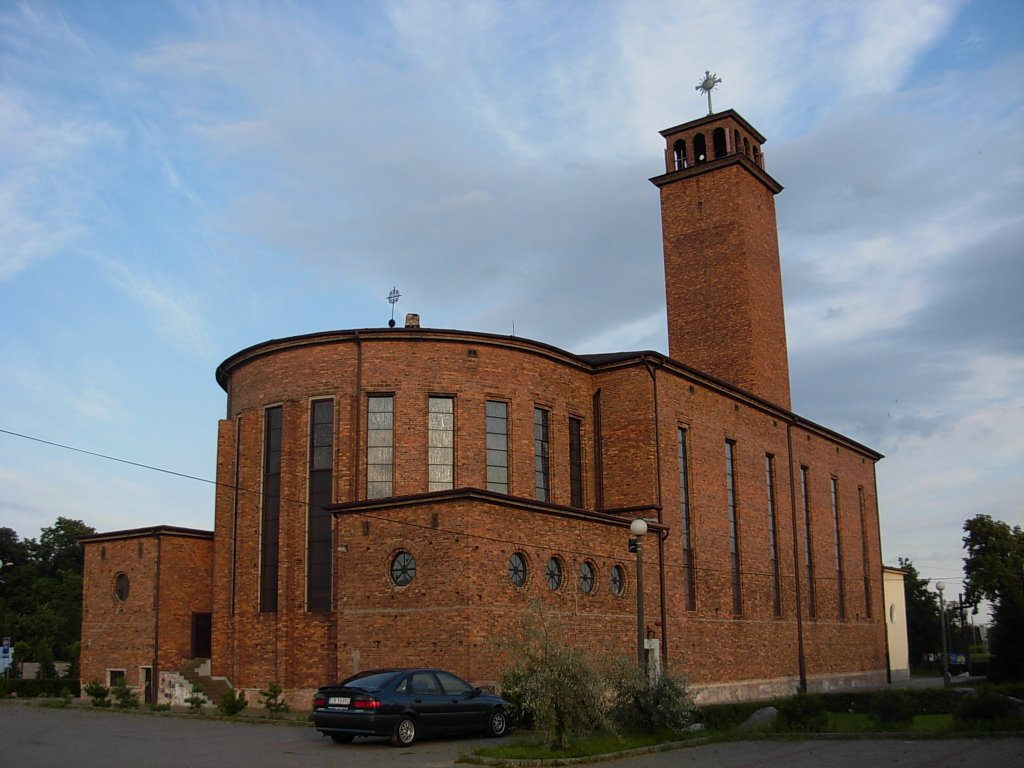
The church with appearing brick walls, before 1990 renovation

A new stage of the parish's development occurred in 1936, when the construction of the church started on the recently acquired plot of Głucha Street. Poznań architect Stefan Cybichowski designed the building in 1935, and the funds were raised by Antoni Laubitz, Archbishop of Gniezno.

Striving to reduce costs, Stefan Cybichowski chose to deviate from the Polish historical church styling elevation. In doing so, he could reduce by 25% the construction spendings. On 5 August 1936, the building permit was issued, and Julian Jarocki's company carried out the initial masonry and carpentry works. Construction activity dragged on, so much so that ceiling and roof were not completed at the outbreak of WWII in September 1939.

=== Second World War ===
In 1939, the Germans designated the building for demolition, as it still was in an unfinished state.

Thanks to Father Polzin, who approached the occupying authorities, it was possible to lease it to a German company for storing there construction tools. The Germans even paid a rent to the parish, saving the future church.

During the conflict, services were held back in the original chapel on Koronowska street.

=== Post WWII years ===
After the end of the war, the church was in an appealing state, having been severely hit by shells. Building works resumed, following the initial design of Stefan Cybichowski, who had been shot in 1940 by the Gestapo.

The new parish priest, Father Czesław Spychalski, performed on 1 December 1945, the mass of dedication of the new church. For the occasion, Cardinal August Hlond, Primate of Poland, made a donation of relics of Saint Francis of Assisi.

The construction works and the finalisation of interiors decoration lasted till the end of the 20th century.

Heavy investments were realized in the late 1940s:

- installation of the organ (1946);
- purchase of chandeliers (1948);
- realisation of pulpit (1949), adorned with images of Saints (Adalbert of Prague, Stanislaus of Szczepanów, Casimir and Andrew Bobola).

Cardinal Stefan Wyszyński, Primate of Poland, solemnly consecrated the organ and the main altar in 1951. A few years later, two side altars were made: one dedicated to Saint Joseph in 1957, and the other to Mary - consecrated by bishop Jan Czerniak in 1961.

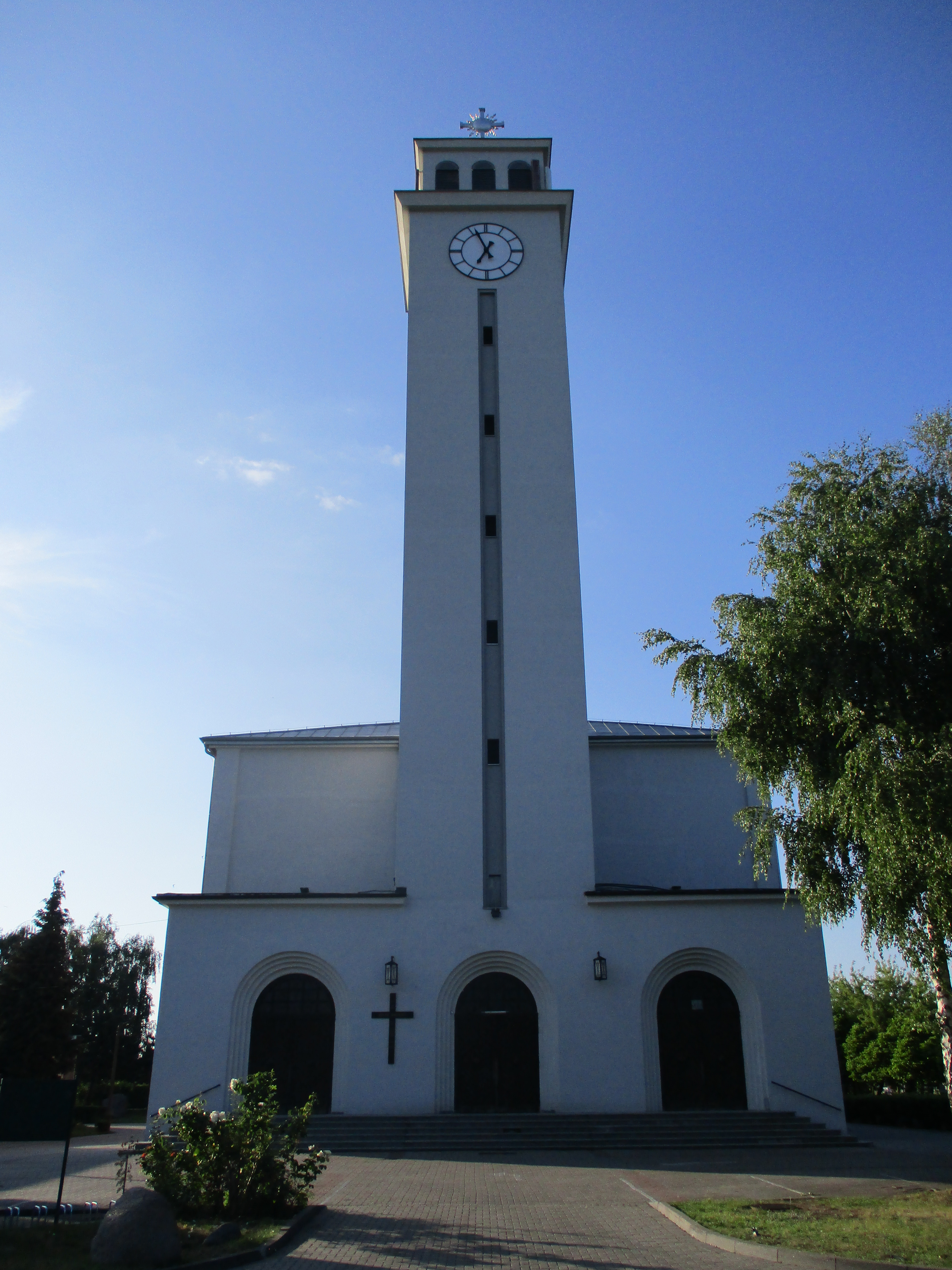
The main facade after refurbishment

From 1964 and 1972, several stained glass windows were installed in the chancel and along the side aisles. Between 1972 and 1984, new furniture, decoration and equipment were procured: pews, confessionalss, lighting, flooring, heating, a figure of the Sacred Heart of Jesus as well as paintings.

In 1985, a new rectory was erected; it has been housing the Chapel of the Holy Cross where masses were celebrated on winter weekdays.

=== Third Republic (1989-present) ===
In 1990, a 10-year long renovation project was carried out, including:

- a new church painting and gutters;
- a marble flooring;
- setting up an altar in the chancel and a new tabernacle;
- new electric heating, sound system and improved lighting.

Eventually, in 2019, works started to renovate the tower and the front elevation, using funds granted by the city authorities for the renovation of historical monuments.

The church has been registered on the Pomeranian Heritage List on 3 August 2006.

== Architecture ==
The church displays three naves, with a semicircular closed chancel on the north. The main facade is dominated by the elongated square church tower, topped by a tented roof.

Many stained glass windows adorned the side walls. The roof over the nave is hipped while a gable roof covers the chancel. The central interior nave is the widest of the three: it opens onto the chancel raised by several steps. There is an ambulatory and lodges on the eastern side.

The central barrel vaulted nave is separated by pillars adorned with chalice-shaped capitals. The side aisles are simply covered with flat ceilings.

=== Interiors ===
==== Altars ====
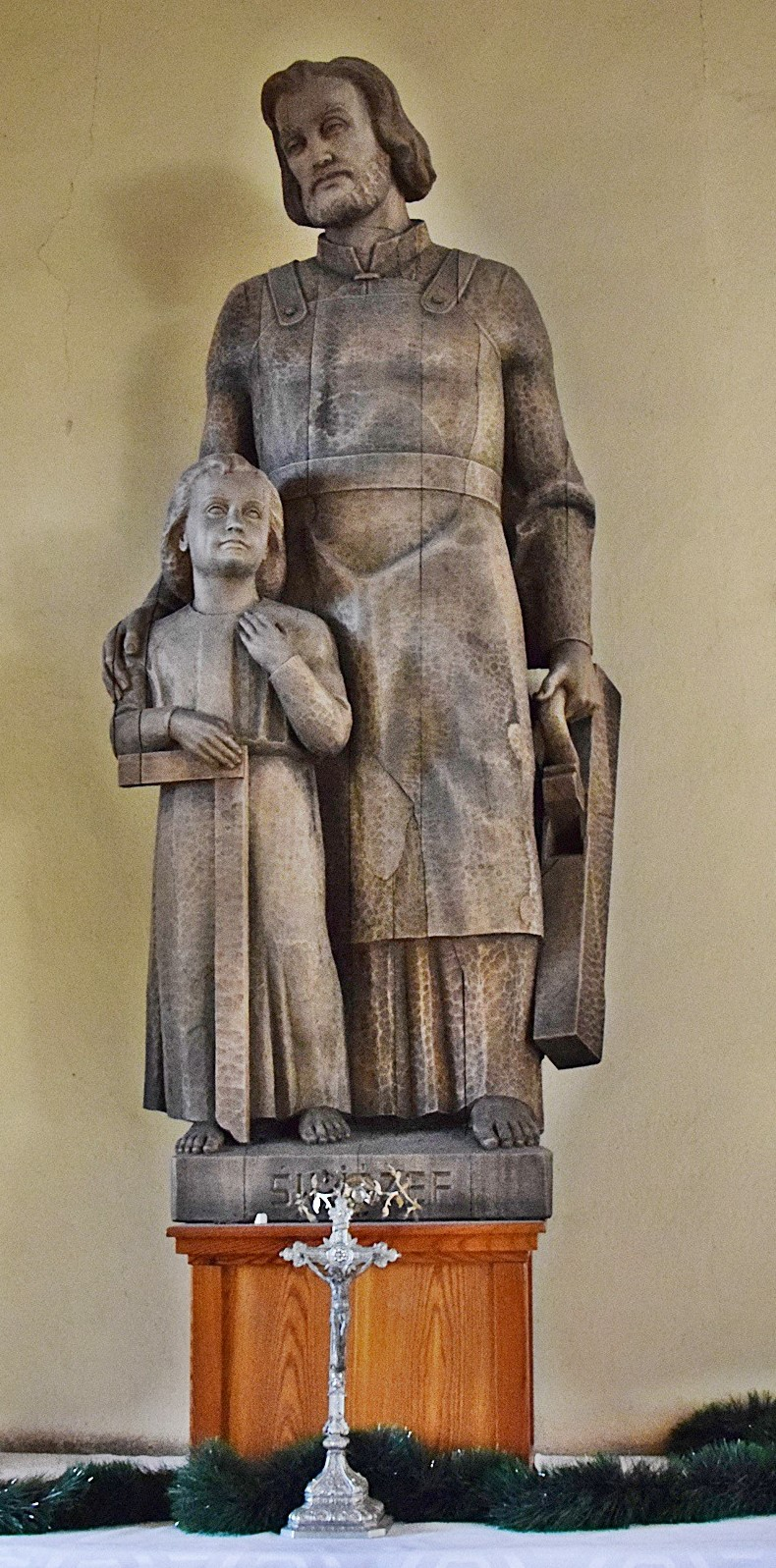
St Joseph's altar

Inside the church, one can notice four altars:

- the main altar is decorated with the representation of parents with a child healed by St. Anthony and a figure of St. Anthony with the Christ Child. The latter had been initially decorating the altar of the first chapel on Koronowska street;
- one side altar with a figure of Saint Francis of Assisi;
- one side altar with the figure of Mary of Nazareth;
- one side altar with the representation of Saint Joseph.

==== Stained glass windows ====
In the chancel, they represent the Millennium of Christianity in Poland (Tysiąclecie chrześcijaństwa w Polsce) and the Second Vatican Council.

On the right side wall they portray:

- the Annunciation;
- Christmas;
- the Resurrection;
- the Pentecost.

On the left side wall, they represent:

- the Good Shepherd;
- Lord Jesus Forgiving;
- the Transfer of Power to St. Peter;
- Under the Cross.

==== Mural paintings ====
Above the chancel, a mural displays Mary the Queen with angels.

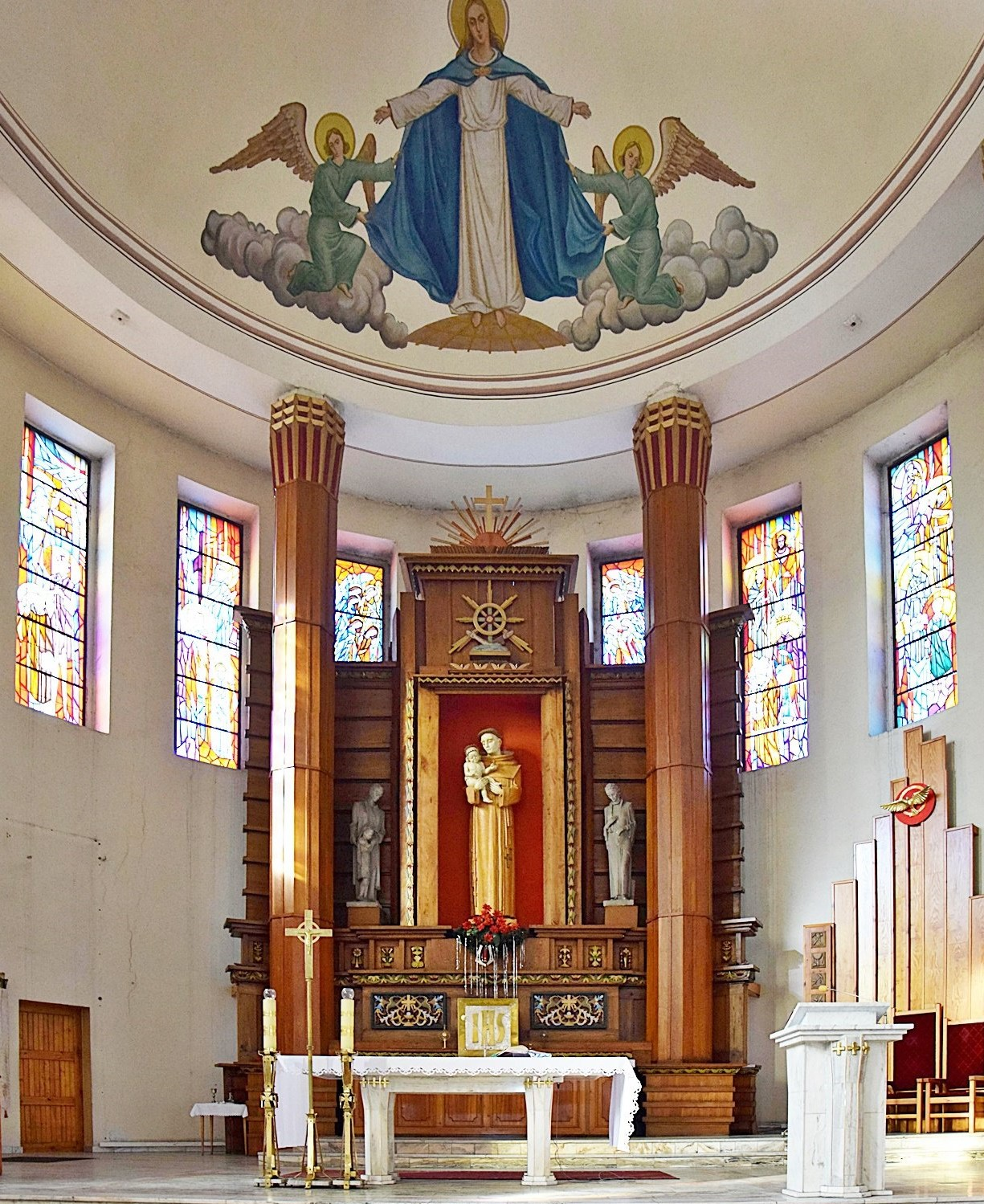
Main altar and chancel stained glass windows

On the right side of the entrance are portrayed:

- St. Stanislaus;
- St. Hyacinth of Poland;
- St. Kinga of Poland;
- St. Casimir;
- St. John Cantius;
- St. Andrew Bobola;
- St. Maximilian Kolbe.

The left side of the entrance displays:

- St. Adalbert;
- St. Yolanda of Poland;
- Blessed Ceslaus;
- Blessed Salomea of Poland;
- St. Stanislaus Kostka;
- Blessed Bronislava of Poland;
- St. Jadwiga of Poland.

==== Paintings ====
One can notice the following subjects:

- St. Thérèse of Lisieux;
- The Black Madonna of Częstochowa;
- St. Maximilian Kolbe;
- Lord Jesus the Merciful.

== Surroundings ==
On the church parvise are located:

- a mission cross;
- a monument in memory of the parish visitation by the original icon of Our Lady of Częstochowa, on 26–27 March 1979.

== Gallery ==
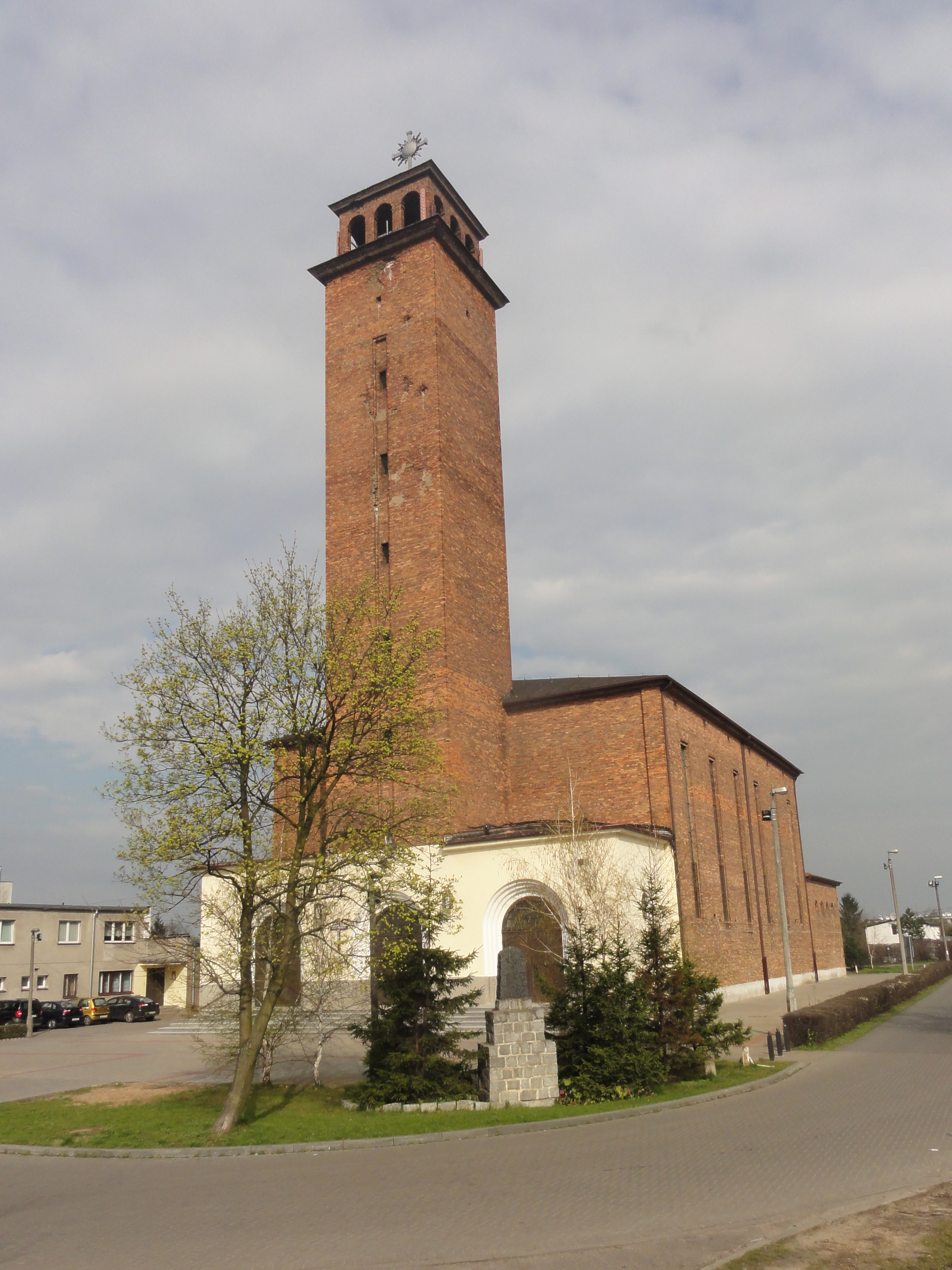
View of the parvise

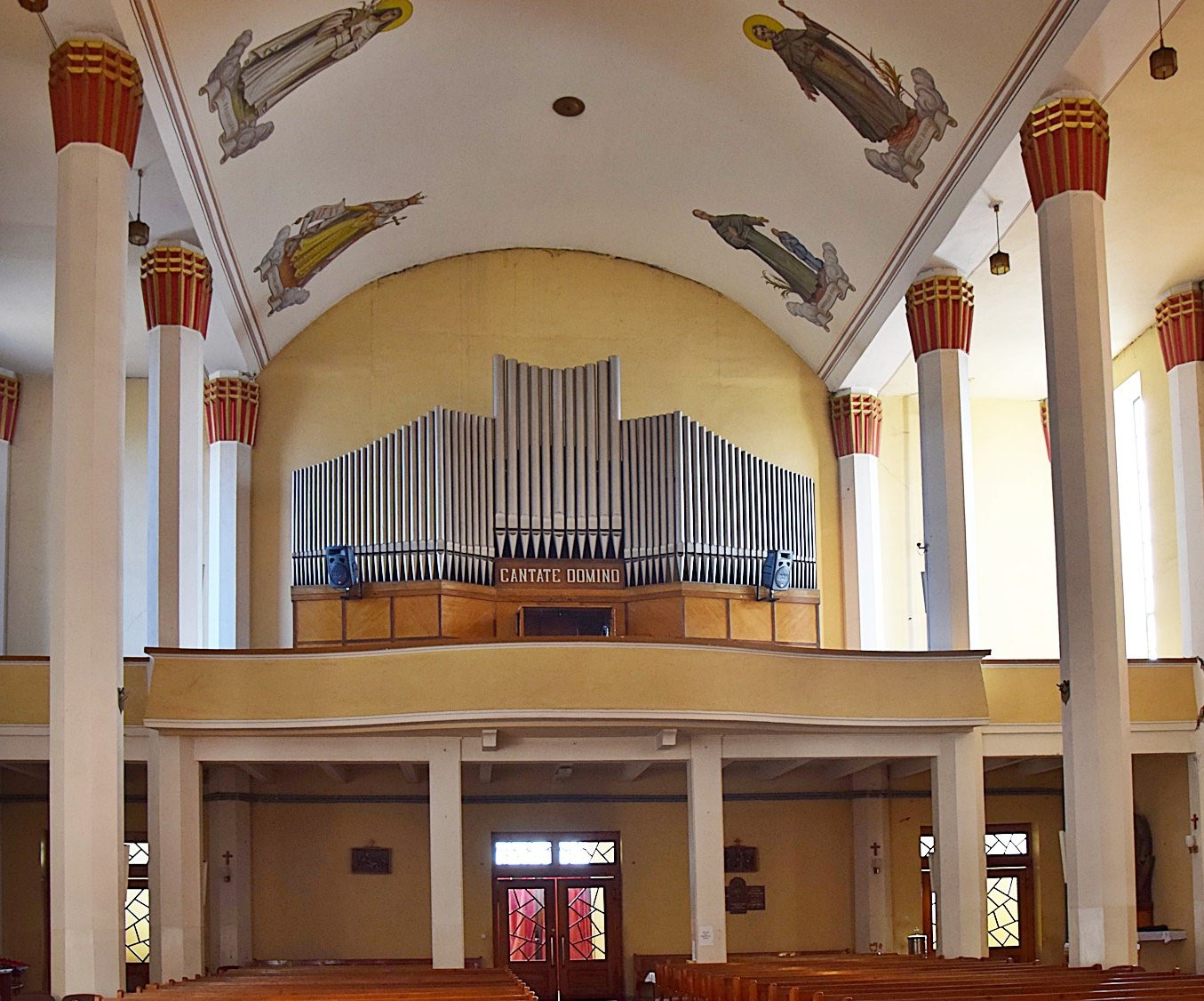
Organ and mural paintings

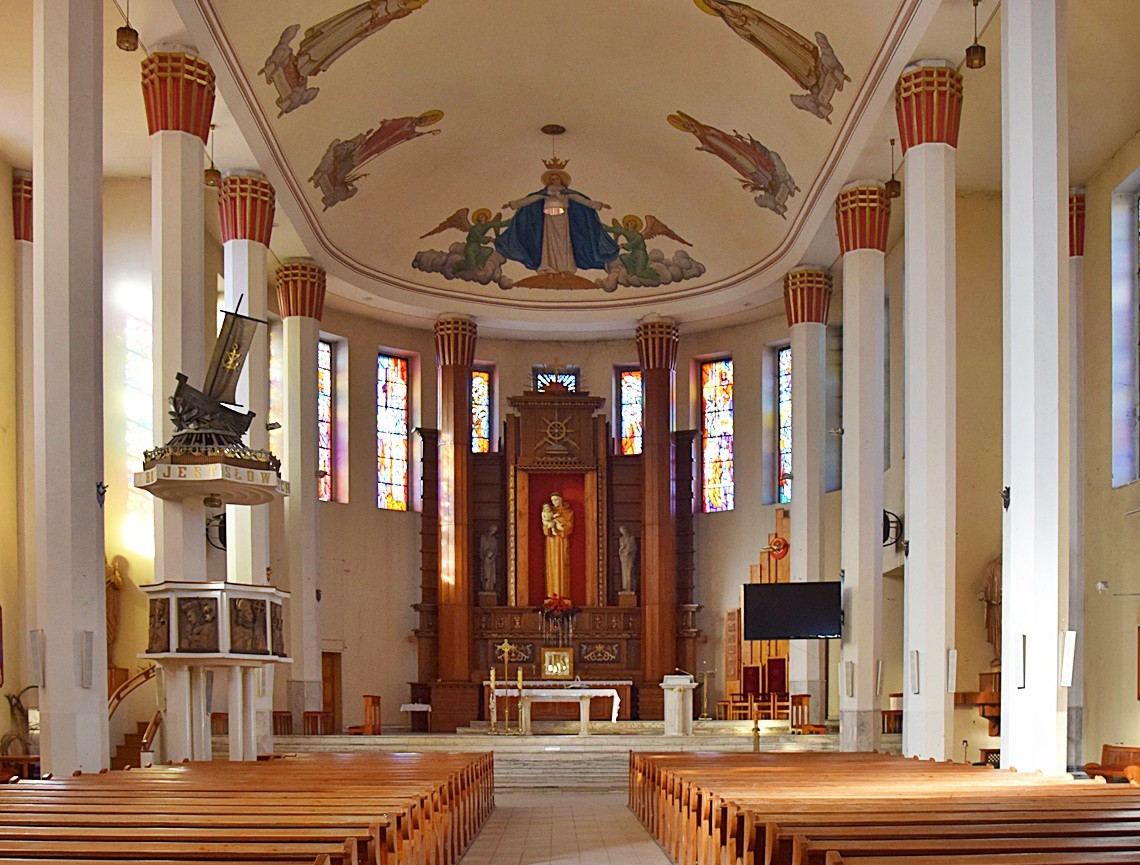
View of the middle nave

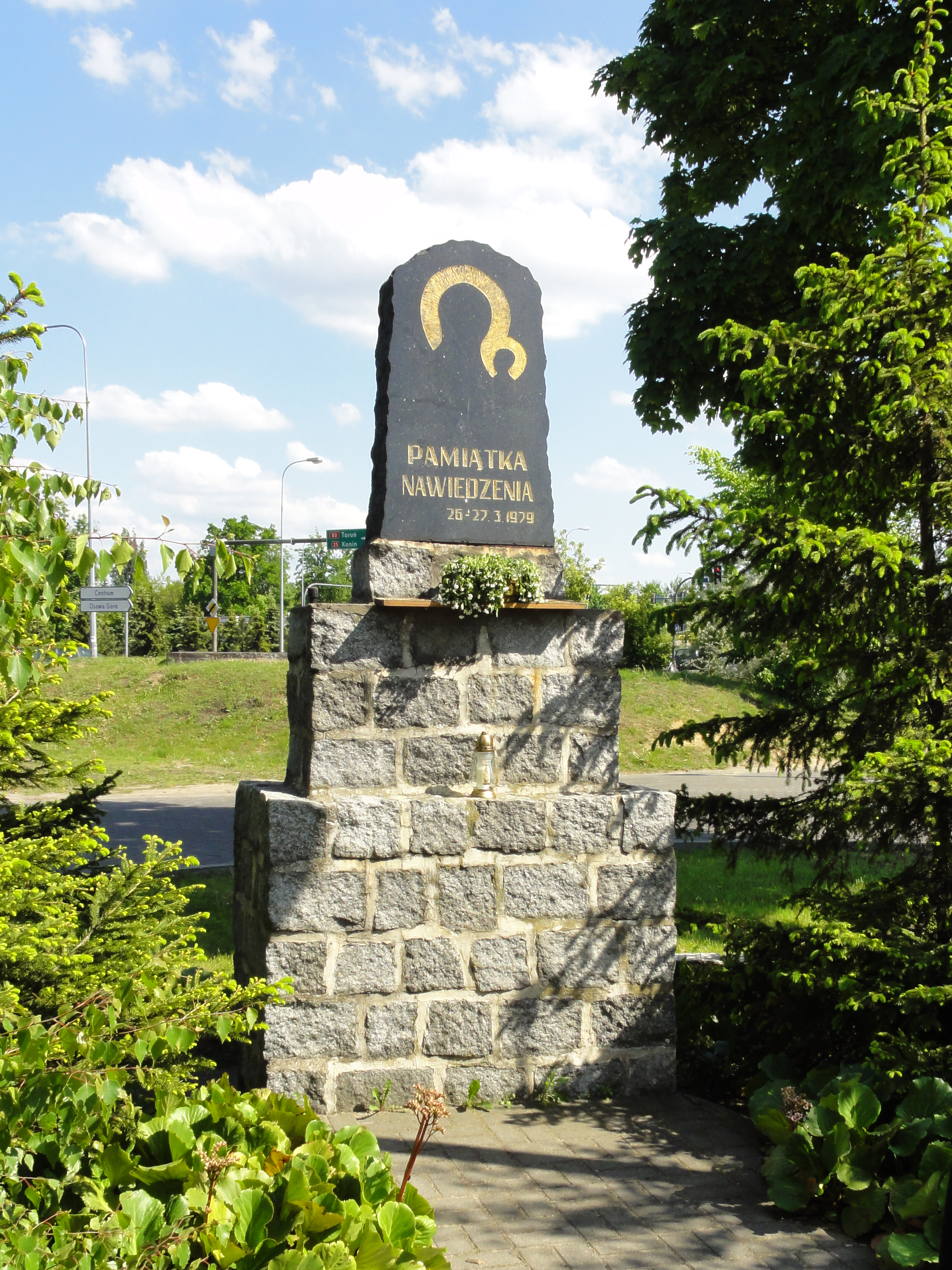
Monument to Our Lady of Częstochowa visit

== See also ==
- Bydgoszcz
- Anthony of Padua
- Second Vatican Council
- Black Madonna of Częstochowa

== Bibliography ==
- Parucka, Krystyna (2008). Zabytki Bydgoszczy – minikatalog [Monuments of Bydgoszcz – mini-catalogue.] (in Polish). Bydgoszcz: Tifen.
