= Zielonka (disambiguation) =

Zielonka is a town in Masovian Voivodeship (east-central Poland).

Zielonka may also refer to:

- Zielonka, Poznań County in Greater Poland Voivodeship (west-central Poland)
- Zielonka, Lower Silesian Voivodeship (south-west Poland)
- Zielonka, Bydgoszcz County in Kuyavian-Pomeranian Voivodeship (north-central Poland)
- Zielonka, Sępólno County in Kuyavian-Pomeranian Voivodeship (north-central Poland)
- Zielonka, Gmina Tuchola in Kuyavian-Pomeranian Voivodeship (north-central Poland)
- Zielonka, Gmina Cekcyn in Kuyavian-Pomeranian Voivodeship (north-central Poland)
- Zielonka, Kraśnik County in Lublin Voivodeship (east Poland)
- Zielonka, Łódź Voivodeship (central Poland)
- Zielonka, Ryki County in Lublin Voivodeship (east Poland)
- Zielonka, Subcarpathian Voivodeship (south-east Poland)
- Zielonka, Świętokrzyskie Voivodeship (south-central Poland)
- Zielonka, Przysucha County in Masovian Voivodeship (east-central Poland)
- Zielonka, Konin County in Greater Poland Voivodeship (west-central Poland)
- Zielonka, Działdowo County in Warmian-Masurian Voivodeship (north Poland)
- Zielonka, Gołdap County in Warmian-Masurian Voivodeship (north Poland)
- Zielonka, Szczytno County in Warmian-Masurian Voivodeship (north Poland)
- Zielonka, West Pomeranian Voivodeship (north-west Poland)
- Zielonka (surname)

== See also ==
- Puszcza Zielonka Landscape Park, Greater Poland Voivodeship
