= Kruszyn Krajeński =

- Village
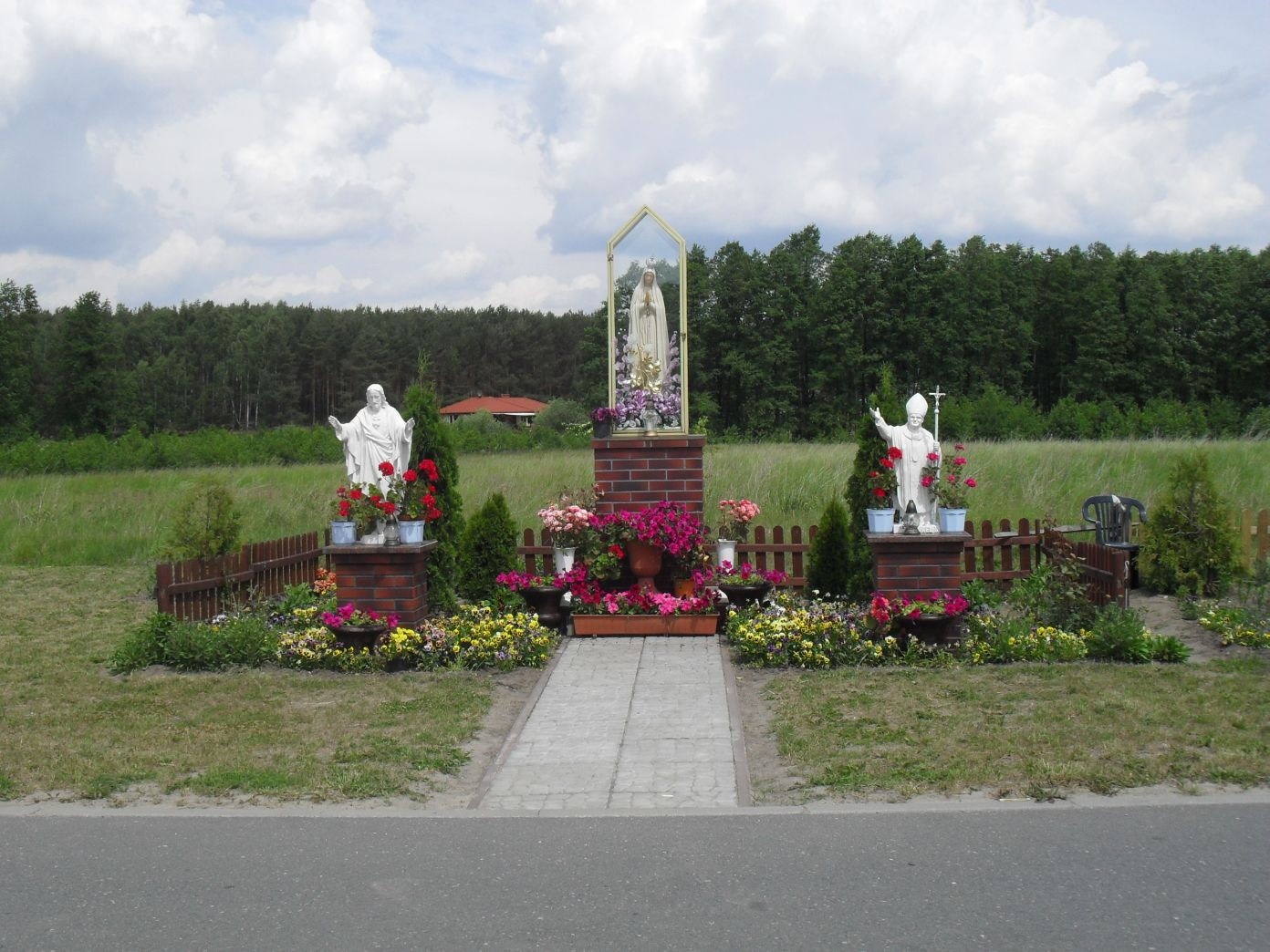
- Wayside shrine

- Location within Poland
- Coordinates: 53°4′52″N 17°52′31″E
- Country: Poland
- Voivodeship: Kuyavian-Pomeranian
- County: Bydgoszcz
- Gmina: Białe Błota

Population
  - Total: 1,000

Kruszyn Krajeński [ˈkruʂɨn kraˈjɛɲski] is a village in the administrative district of Gmina Białe Błota, within Bydgoszcz County, Kuyavian-Pomeranian Voivodeship, in north-central Poland.

== Notable residents ==
- Gerhard Kollewe (1912-1942), Luftwaffe pilot
