= Ciele =

- Village
- Location within Poland
- Coordinates: 53°5′N 17°55′E
- Country: Poland
- Voivodeship: Kuyavian-Pomeranian
- County: Bydgoszcz
- Gmina: Białe Błota

Ciele [ˈt͡ɕɛlɛ] is a village in the administrative district of Gmina Białe Błota, within Bydgoszcz County, Kuyavian-Pomeranian Voivodeship, in north-central Poland.
