= Białe Błota, Bydgoszcz County =

Białe Błota
- Village
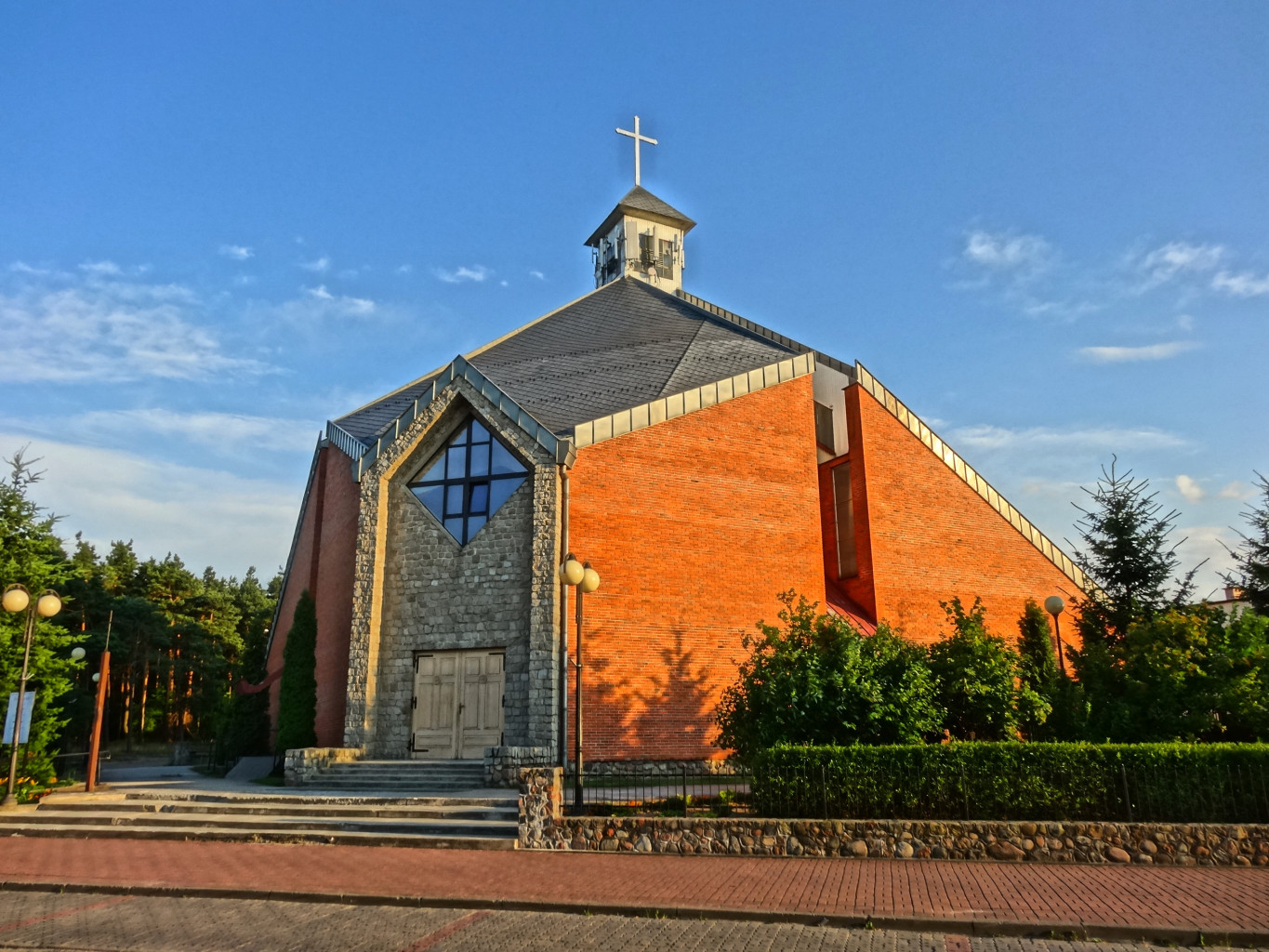
- Church of Christ, the Good Shepherd

- Coat of arms

- Location within Poland
- Coordinates: 53°5′56″N 17°54′58″E
- Country: Poland
- Voivodeship: Kuyavian-Pomeranian
- County: Bydgoszcz
- Gmina: Białe Błota

Government
  - Mayor: Katarzyna Kirstein-Piotrowska

Population
  - Total: 5,575
- Time zone: UTC+1 (CET)
  - Summer (DST): UTC+2 (CEST)
- Postal code: 86-005
- Area code: +48 52
- Car plates: CBY
- Website: http://www.bialeblota.pl

Białe Błota [ˈbjawɛ ˈbwɔta] (German: Weißfelde) is a village in Bydgoszcz County, Kuyavian-Pomeranian Voivodeship, in north-central Poland. It is the seat of the gmina (administrative district) called Gmina Białe Błota.

The village has a population of 5,775.

Four Polish citizens were murdered by Nazi Germany in the village during World War II.
