= Gmina Białe Błota =

Gmina Białe Błota Białe Błota Commune
- Gmina
- Flag Coat of arms

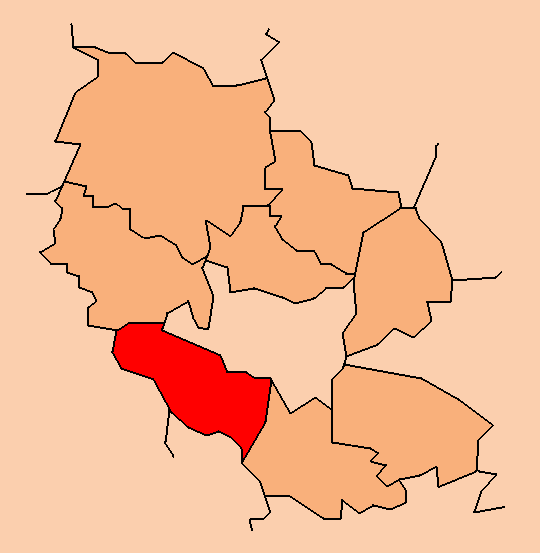
- Location within the county
- Coordinates (Białe Błota): 53°5′56″N 17°54′58″E
- Country: Poland
- Voivodeship: Kuyavian-Pomeranian
- County: Bydgoszcz County
- Seat: Białe Błota

Area
  - Total: 122.1 km^{2} (47.1 sq mi)

Population (2006)
  - Total: 14,003
  - Density: 114.7/km^{2} (297.0/sq mi)
- Website: http://www.bialeblota.pl/

Gmina Białe Błota is a rural gmina (administrative district) in Bydgoszcz County, Kuyavian-Pomeranian Voivodeship, in north-central Poland. Its seat is the village of Białe Błota, which lies approximately 6 kilometres (4 mi) west of Bydgoszcz.

The gmina covers an area of 122.1 square kilometres (47.1 sq mi), and as of 2006 its total population is 14,003.

== Villages ==
Gmina Białe Błota contains the villages and settlements of Białe Błota, Ciele, Dębinek, Drzewce, Kruszyn Krajeński, Lipniki, Lisi Ogon, Łochowice, Łochowo, Murowaniec, Prądki, Przyłęki, Trzciniec and Zielonka.

== Neighbouring gminas ==
Gmina Białe Błota is bordered by the town of Bydgoszcz and by the gminas of Łabiszyn, Nakło nad Notecią, Nowa Wieś Wielka, Sicienko and Szubin.
