= Battle of Płowce =

1331 battle of the Polish-Teutonic War

- Part of the Polish-Teutonic War (1326–1332)
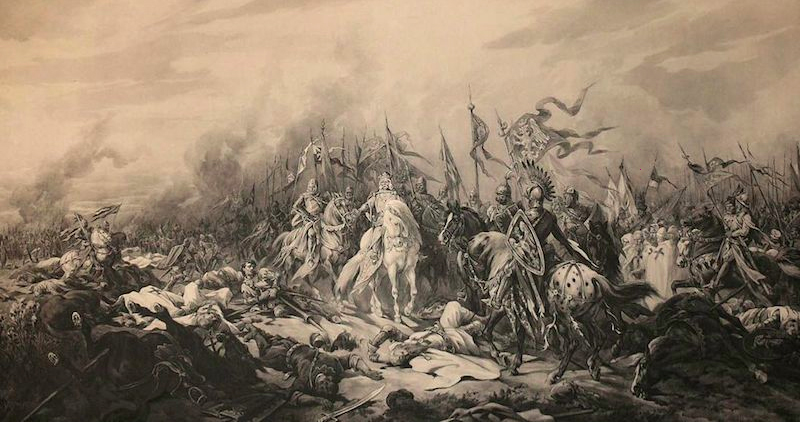
- Juliusz Kossak, Płowce
Date	27 September 1331
Location	Płowce, Poland 52°36′56″N 18°38′38″E
Result	Polish victory

Belligerents
Kingdom of Poland	Teutonic Order

Commanders and leaders
Władysław I the Elbow-high; Casimir III of Poland	Heinrich Reuss von Plauen; Otto von Lutterberg; Otto von Bonsdorf; Herman von Oppen

Strength
5,000	2,300, another 4,000 late stage of the battle.

Casualties and losses
1,900–2,100	2,200–2,400

The Battle of Płowce took place on 27 September 1331 between the Kingdom of Poland and the Teutonic Order.

== Background ==
The Teutonic plan was to support John of Bohemia in an invasion of Silesia. Władysław I the Elbow-high had claimed lordship over Silesia, but John believed that he had an equally valid claim to it. The Bohemian king marched in with an army and occupied Silesia. Luther von Braunschweig believed that Władysław would be so outraged by this move that he would muster all of the Polish forces to drive John out of Silesia, leaving the Germans free to invade Samogitia without Polish interference.

In order to increase the chances of John securing Silesia, Braunschweig aided the Bohemian army with his own forces and any other force that he could muster. A rather large army consisting of Bohemians (Czechs), knights from the Teutonic order, rebel Polish noblemen who wished to make a stand against Władysław, mercenaries from the Holy Roman Empire and some English crusaders all set off for Poland. Władysław scrambled to assemble the Polish forces, along with soldiers from Lithuania and Hungary, into position. The elderly Władysław delegated a significant portion of the command to his son, Casimir III of Poland. Many of the Polish soldiers were not confident of Casimir's military capabilities, and large-scale desertions occurred when Władysław took measures to increased Casimir's authority. Casimir did not offer much resistance to the invasion of Poland by the Teutonic Order, and he was nearly captured by the Teutonic knights before narrowly escaping into a nearby forest.

Władysław led the remainder of the Polish forces south toward the Bohemian army. The Teutonic army reached Silesia successfully and met up with the Bohemians. Władysław determined that his forces were insufficient to repel the invaders, so John of Bohemia set himself up as the occupier of Silesia. John then set off to matters in Italy when there still was a pocket of resistance in Silesia. Well-fortified Polish castles in the region held out and little would be done to capture them. This led to Braunschweig to believe that Poland would still be a major threat and that his forces could not act as they wished in the Baltic region. Braunschweig sent word to John and wanted to start a second invasion of Poland, hoping that it would be more decisive than the previous invasion attempt.

== Battle ==
The plan for the Teutonic army, led by Marshal Dietrich von Altenburg, was to pull back from Poland. Władysław I the Elbow-high, who by this time was suffering from poor health, led the Polish forces. Though his troops outnumbered the Teutons, they were not equipped as well as their enemy. The Polish king followed the Teutonic army and found an opportunity when Marshal Dietrich von Altenburg split his forces into three sections. Władysław decided to attack the weakest of these three sections, which had descended upon the small village of Płowce.

A heavy fog had descended over the area when Altenburg gathered his forces and divided them into five divisions. They Polish were also grouped into five divisions. A lengthy, hard-fought battle ensued that lasted from sunrise until 3:00 p.m. the same day. The armies were fairly evenly matched, and the deadlock was only broken when a horse carrying the marshal's banner was pierced by a spear and the Teutonic army saw the banner fall, assuming that their leader had fallen, and began to flee the battle.

The Polish forces took advantage of the fleeing Teutons and struck hard, turning the tide of the battle in their favor. By the end of the battle, Władysław and his son Casimir III of Poland had 56 Teutonic knights in their custody, along with Altenburg however Teutons managed to take back most of the captives.

An army of Teutonic knights was dispatched from Prussia to relieve the forces at Płowce and were fast approaching the battle. The exhausted Polish troops engaged in another hard-fought battle, continuing until nightfall, when King Łokietek ordered the withdraw from the battlefield. Altenburg was released after he was found chained to a wagon. After the battle, the Teutonic Knights kept 56 of the most valuable Polish prisoners alive, murdering the rest. According to the chronicler Wigand from Marburg, Bishop Maciej from Gołańcza ordered to count the dead before the burial after the battle, and it was found that 4,187 fighters on both sides were killed, most of whom were Teutonic Knights.

== Aftermath ==
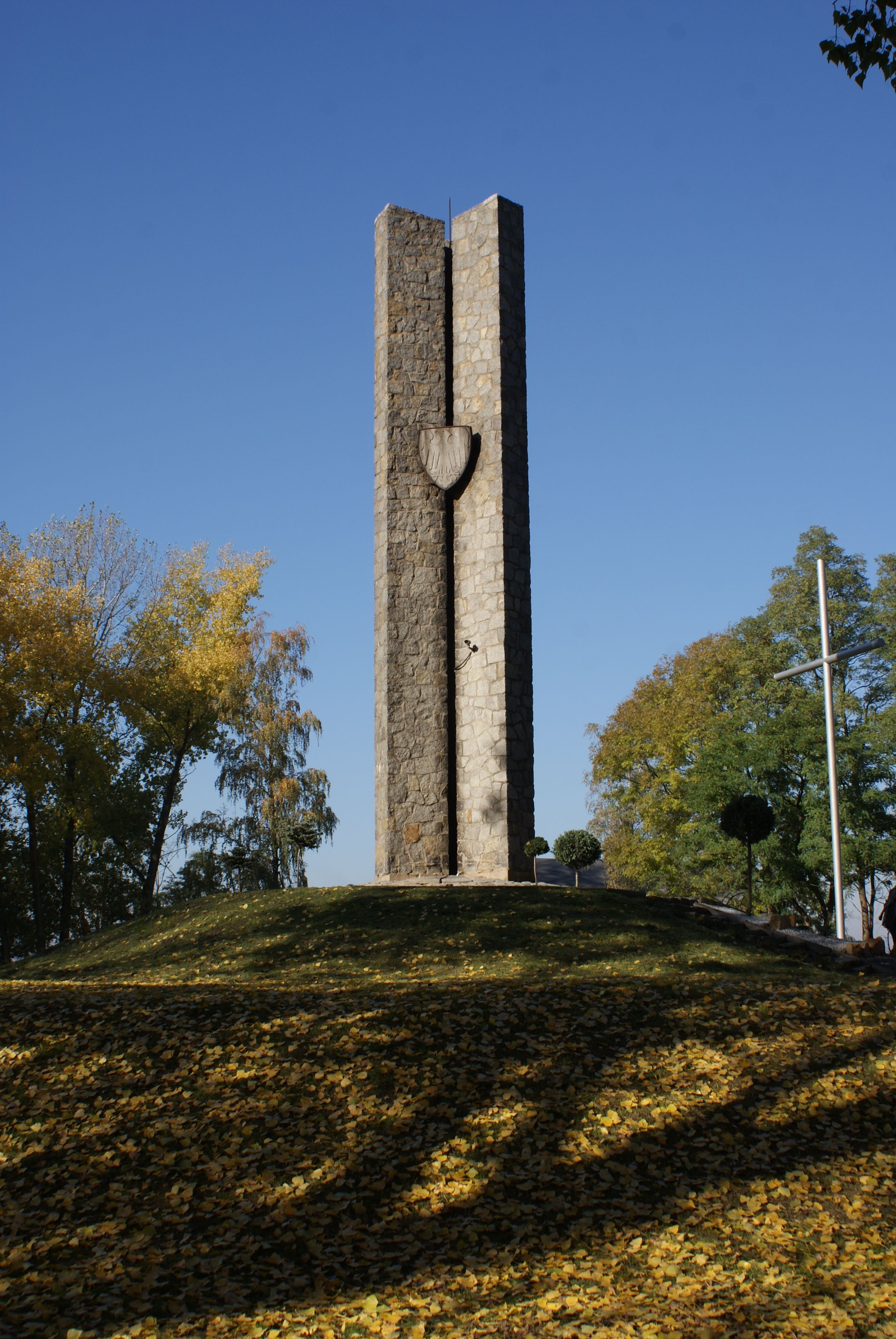
Płowce memorial

The Chełmno Commander Otto von Lutterberg, despite repelling the attack of the Polish army, decided to stop the march to Brześć Kujawski and, under the cover of darkness, to immediately retreat to Toruń without burying his own fallen. The decision to withdraw the Teutonic forces also meant that the entire campaign in Poland was interrupted, and therefore this battle can be considered a strategic success of Władysław Łokietek. The battle also prevented the Teutonic army from joining the Czech troops of John of Luxembourg, whose cooperation could lead to the collapse of the recently reunited Kingdom of Poland.

After the battle, both sides tried to use their successes for propaganda purposes. The battle greatly strengthened the morale of Polish troops and made a great impression on the fourteenth century Polish society. The conviction of the triumph of the Polish army was emphasized by the ceremonial entry of Władysław Łokietek to Krakow with the captured Commander Henryk Reuss von Plauen and 40 other prisoners. The fact that the battle was a Polish success is also evidenced by the Teutonic Order's report from 1335 for the Teutonic prosecutor at the papal curia in Avignon.
