= Zgłowiączka (river) =

River in Poland

Zgłowiączka river
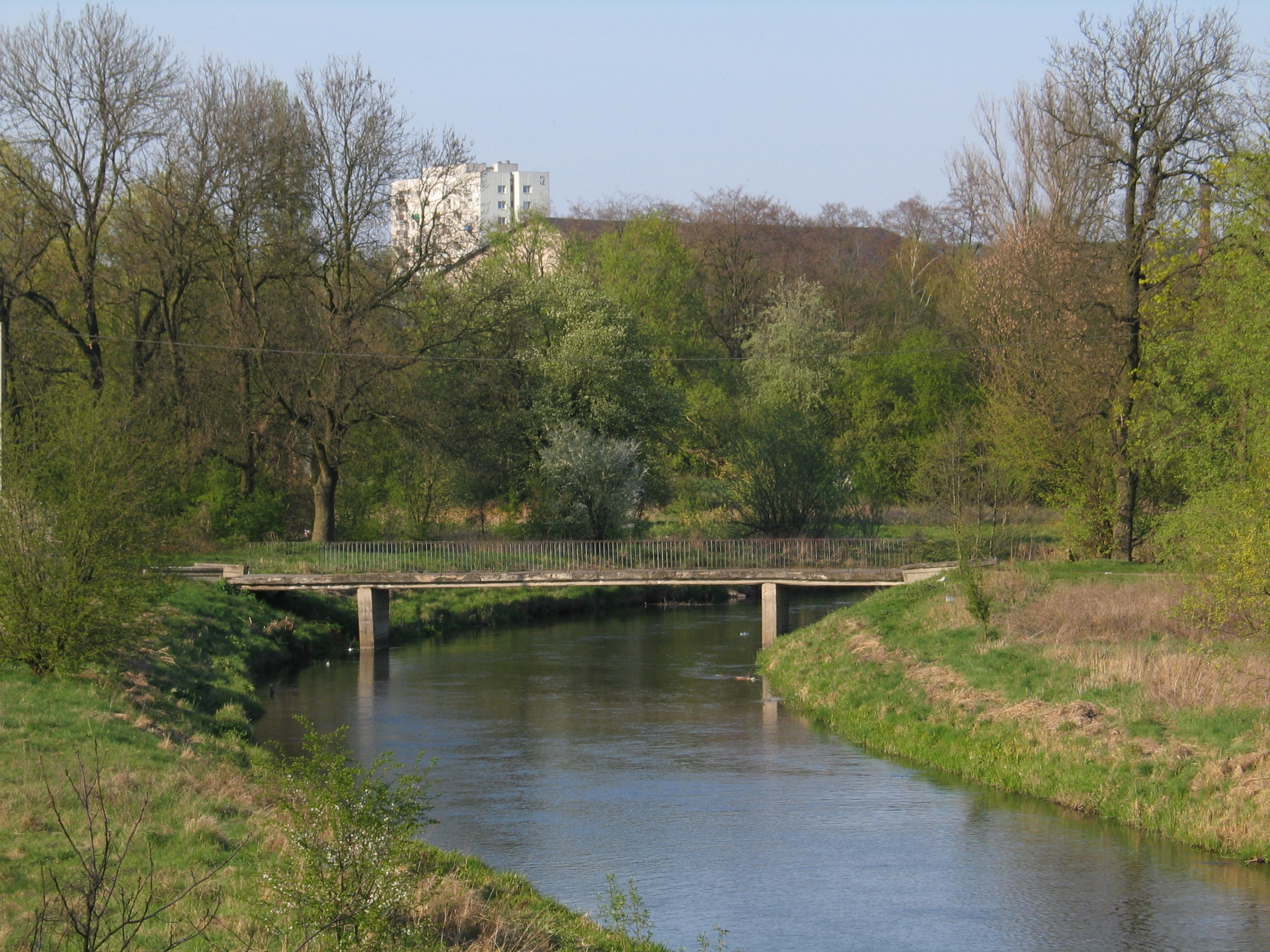
- Zgłowiączka in Włocławek (Słodowo neighbourhood)

- Location of mouth

Location
- Country: Poland

Physical characteristics
- Source
  - location: Płowce
- Mouth
  - location: Włocławek
  - coordinates: 52°31′01″N 18°37′55″E
- Length: 79 km (49 mi)
- Basin size: 1,495.6 km^{2} (577.5 sq mi)

Basin features
- River system: Vistula
- Tributaries
  - left: Bachorze Canal
  - right: Chodeczka River, Lubienka River

The Zgłowiączka river is a 79 km long left-bank tributary of the Vistula. The area of its basin is 1495.6 km2. The river starts from the Głuszyński Canal, which has its sources near the village of Płowce. Zgłowiączka flows through Głuszyńskie Lake and joins the Vistula in Włocławek. Important tributaries of the river include: Chodeczka and Lubienka (right-handed) and Bachorze Canal (left-handed).

Above the town of Lubraniec, the water is ranked as class IV purity, and below the town of Brześć Kujawski as class V purity (data from 2007/2008).

== Water sports ==
The kayaking route is characterized by its lowland nature and is relatively easy in terms of difficulty (except for some slightly difficult sections below Nowy Młyn). Its difficulty scale is assessed as U3 (permanent portages due to sandbanks, fallen trees and wicker thickets in the current). In the attractiveness scale it is categorised as **, i.e. picturesque. The route is available on the whole length only when the water level is higher than average - in spring or after rainfall. Since 1990 the Włooławek branch of PTTK (Polish Tourist and Sightseeing Society) - Włocławek Water Club has been organizing canoeing on the river (about 55 km, from Orle to Sienkiewicz Park in Włocławek).
