= Arthur Godenau =

German Nazi military officer

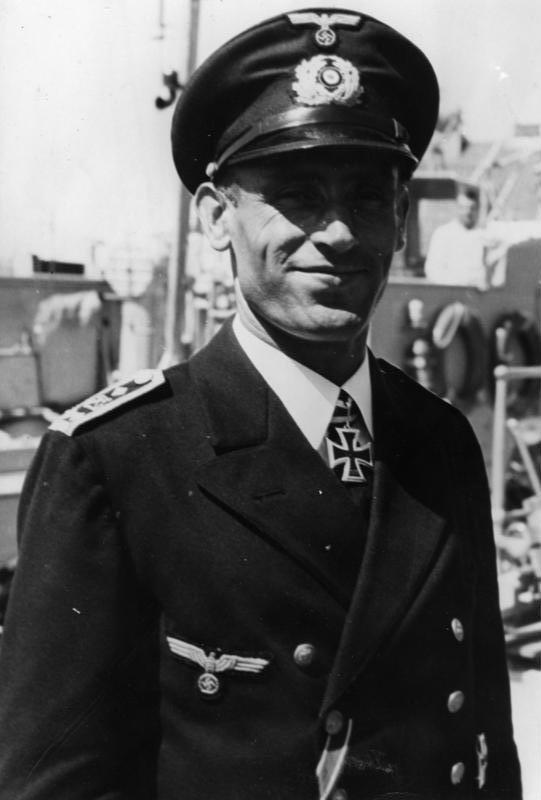
- Born: 19 January 1903; Netzort, Province of Posen, German Empire
- Died: 16 February 1983 (aged 80); Laboe
- Other name: Artur Leo Gadaszewski
- Military career
- Allegiance: Nazi Germany
- Branch: Kriegsmarine
- Service years: 1925–1945
- Rank: Kapitänleutnant (captain lieutenant)
- Unit: SSS Niobe
- Commands: Räumboot R-17, R-51 and R-73
- Conflicts: World War II
- Awards: Knight's Cross of the Iron Cross

Arthur Godenau (19 January 1903 - 16 February 1983) was a German Kriegsmarine officer who was born in Przyłęki (German: Netzort) and took part in the German operation against Norway.

== Career ==
Godenau was born on 19 January 1903 in Netzort, Kreis Bromberg in Province of Posen within the German Empire, present-day Przyłęki. At birth, his name was Artur Leo Gadaszewski, later renamed to Godenau. He joined the military service of Reichsmarine, the German Navy during the Weimar Republic, on 1 April 1925 with the 1st department of the standing ship division of the North Sea. (Note: 1st department —I. Abteilung) (Note: standing ship division —Schiffsstammdivision) On 26 September, Godenau was transferred to the 3rd Half-Flotilla for further training. (Note: 3rd Half-Flotilla —3. Halbflottille) On 1 April 1927, he was promoted to Obermatrose (Seaman 1st Class).

On 31 August 1934, Godenau was appointed commander of R-11, an R boat in the 1st Minesweeper-Half-Flotilla, (Note: 1st Minesweeper-Half-Flotilla—1. Räum-Halbflottille) commanding this boat for four months. On 1 January 1939, he was promoted to Stabsobersteuermann, a non-commissioned officers rank.

== World War II ==
During Operation Weserübung, the German invasion of Denmark and Norway, Godenau commanded R-17. On 9 April 1940, a German task force consisting of the torpedo boats Albatros and Kondor, accompanied by R-17 and R-21, heavily laden with troops attacked the Norwegian naval base at Horten which became the Battle of Horten Harbour. During the assault, R-17 was sunk by the minelayer Olav Tryggvason.

He earned significant awards, such as Knight's Cross of the Iron Cross on 31 May 1940 when he commanded R-17 in R-Boat Flotilla I (for successfully helping to ensure the capture of the Horten harbor in an undamaged state).

Godenau was then scheduled to take command of R-51. This was cancelled and he was given command of R-73 which he commissioned on 21 May 1941. On 24 December, Godenau was promoted to Leutnant zur See (lieutenant at sea), effective as of 1 January 1942.

In 1944, Godenau became an instructor with the Befehlshabers der Sicherung der Nordsee (BSN—Commander of the Defense of the North Sea), training new officers at Hörnum.

He later died in Laboe, the circumstances of his death are yet unknown. He is buried in Laboe.

== Awards ==
- Wehrmacht Long Service Award
  - 4th Class (2 October 1936)
  - 3rd Class (31 March 1937)
- Iron Cross (1939)
  - 2nd Class (10 October 1939)
  - 1st Class (9 May 1940)
- Knight's Cross of the Iron Cross on 31 May 1940 as Stabsobersteuermann and commander of Räumboot R-17 in the 1. Räumbootflottille (Note: According to Fellgiebel as commander of R-51.)
- Kriegsabzeichen für Minensuch-, U-Boot-Jagd- und Sicherungsverbände (6 November 1940)

== Translation notes ==
=== Bibliography ===
- Brazier, K. (2021). The Complete Knight's Cross: The Years of Victory 1939-1941 (Volume 1). Fonthill Media.
- Dörr, Manfred (1995). Die Ritterkreuzträger der Überwasserstreitkräfte der Kriegsmarine—Band 1: A–K [The Knight's Cross Bearers of the Surface Forces of the Navy—Volume 1: A–K] (in German). Osnabrück, Germany: Biblio Verlag. ISBN 978-3-7648-2453-2.
- Fellgiebel, Walther-Peer [in German] (2000) [1986]. Die Träger des Ritterkreuzes des Eisernen Kreuzes 1939–1945 — Die Inhaber der höchsten Auszeichnung des Zweiten Weltkrieges aller Wehrmachtteile [The Bearers of the Knight's Cross of the Iron Cross 1939–1945 — The Owners of the Highest Award of the Second World War of all Wehrmacht Branches] (in German). Friedberg, Germany: Podzun-Pallas. ISBN 978-3-7909-0284-6.
- Haarr, G.H. (2011). The German Invasion of Norway, April 1940. Pen and Sword Books. ISBN 978-1-78346-967-3.
- Hildebrand, Hans H.; Röhr, Albert & Steinmetz, Hans-Otto (1993). Die Deutschen Kriegsschiffe [The German Warships] (in German). Vol. 1. Ratingen: Mundus Verlag. ISBN 978-3-7822-0210-7.
- Scherzer, Veit (2007). Die Ritterkreuzträger 1939–1945 Die Inhaber des Ritterkreuzes des Eisernen Kreuzes 1939 von Heer, Luftwaffe, Kriegsmarine, Waffen-SS, Volkssturm sowie mit Deutschland verbündeter Streitkräfte nach den Unterlagen des Bundesarchives [The Knight's Cross Bearers 1939–1945 The Holders of the Knight's Cross of the Iron Cross 1939 by Army, Air Force, Navy, Waffen-SS, Volkssturm and Allied Forces with Germany According to the Documents of the Federal Archives] (in German). Jena, Germany: Scherzers Militaer-Verlag. ISBN 978-3-938845-17-2.
