= Lipniki, Kuyavian-Pomeranian Voivodeship =

Lipniki
- Village
- Location within Poland
- Coordinates: 53°5′20″N 17°52′21″E
- Country: Poland
- Voivodeship: Kuyavian-Pomeranian
- County: Bydgoszcz
- Gmina: Białe Błota
- Population: 90

Lipniki (Polish pronunciation: [lipˈɲikʲi]) is a village in the administrative district of Gmina Białe Błota, within Bydgoszcz County, Kuyavian-Pomeranian Voivodeship, in north-central Poland.
