= Płowce =

- Village
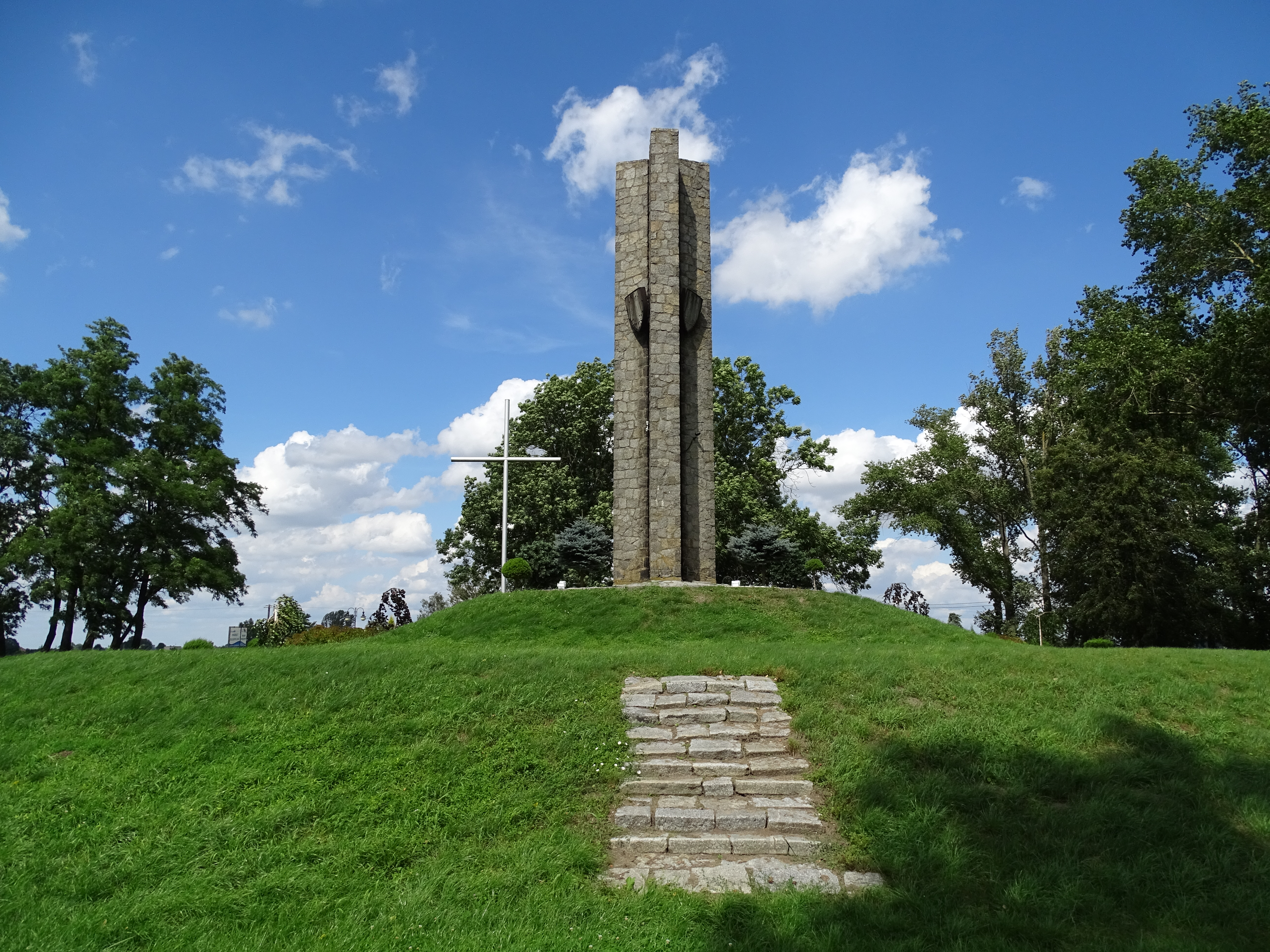
- Monument at the site of the Battle of Płowce of 1331

- Location within Poland
- Coordinates: 52°36′56″N 18°38′38″E
- Country: Poland
- Voivodeship: Kuyavian-Pomeranian
- County: Radziejów
- Gmina: Radziejów
- Population: 570
- Time zone: UTC+1 (CET)
  - Summer (DST): UTC+2 (CEST)
- Vehicle registration: CRA

Płowce [ˈpwɔft͡sɛ] is a village in the administrative district of Gmina Radziejów, within Radziejów County, Kuyavian-Pomeranian Voivodeship, in north-central Poland.

It is best known for the Battle of Płowce, which took place on 27 September 1331 between the kingdom of Poland (led by King Władysław I Łokietek) and the Teutonic Knights. Although there was no outright winner, it stopped the expansion of the Teutonic Order in the Kuyavia region. The battlefield is marked by a cross and monument.
