= Zielonka, Bydgoszcz County =

Zielonka
- Village
- Location within Poland
- Coordinates: 53°3′13″N 17°56′48″E
- Country: Poland
- Voivodeship: Kuyavian-Pomeranian
- County: Bydgoszcz
- Gmina: Białe Błota
- Website: http://www.zielonka1.home.pl/

Zielonka [ʑɛˈlɔŋka] is a village in the administrative district of Gmina Białe Błota, within Bydgoszcz County, Kuyavian-Pomeranian Voivodeship, in north-central Poland.
