= Zielonka (surname) =

Zielonka is a Polish surname. There is a Polish noble family under this surname, of the Jastrzębiec coat of arms. Notable people with the surname include:

- Shmuel Zielonka, birth name of Sam Zell, Jewish American business magnate
- Teresa Ceglecka-Zielonka (born 1957), Polish politician
- Manfred Zielonka (born 1960), West German Olympic boxer
- Martin Zielonka (1877–1938), German-American rabbi
