= Drzewce, Kuyavian-Pomeranian Voivodeship =

Drzewce
- Village
- Location within Poland
- Coordinates: 53°6′24″N 17°52′4″E
- Country: Poland
- Voivodeship: Kuyavian-Pomeranian
- County: Bydgoszcz
- Gmina: Białe Błota

Drzewce [ˈdʐɛft͡sɛ] is a village in the administrative district of Gmina Białe Błota, within Bydgoszcz County, Kuyavian-Pomeranian Voivodeship, in north-central Poland.
