= Antoniewo, Żnin County =

Antoniewo
- Village
- Location within Poland
- Coordinates: 52°59′4″N 17°58′41″E
- Country: Poland
- Voivodeship: Kuyavian-Pomeranian
- County: Żnin
- Gmina: Łabiszyn

Antoniewo [antɔˈɲɛvɔ] is a village in the administrative district of Gmina Łabiszyn, within Żnin County, Kuyavian-Pomeranian Voivodeship, in north-central Poland.
