= Murowaniec, Kuyavian-Pomeranian Voivodeship =

Murowaniec
- Village
- Location within Poland
- Coordinates: 53°5′36″N 17°51′27″E
- Country: Poland
- Voivodeship: Kuyavian-Pomeranian
- County: Bydgoszcz
- Gmina: Białe Błota
- Population: 962

Murowaniec [murɔˈvaɲɛt͡s] is a village in the administrative district of Gmina Białe Błota, within Bydgoszcz County, Kuyavian-Pomeranian Voivodeship, in north-central Poland.
