= Przyłęki, Kuyavian-Pomeranian Voivodeship =

Przyłęki
- Village
- Location within Poland
- Coordinates: 53°2′13″N 17°58′0″E
- Country: Poland
- Voivodeship: Kuyavian-Pomeranian
- County: Bydgoszcz
- Gmina: Białe Błota
- Population: 600

Przyłęki [pʂɨˈwɛŋki] is a village in the administrative district of Gmina Białe Błota, within Bydgoszcz County, Kuyavian-Pomeranian Voivodeship, in north-central Poland.

== Notable residents ==
- Arthur Godenau (1903–1983), Kriegsmarine officer
