= Prądki =

- Village
- Location within Poland
- Coordinates: 53°03′18″N 17°56′16″E
- Country: Poland
- Voivodeship: Kuyavian-Pomeranian
- County: Bydgoszcz
- Gmina: Białe Błota

Prądki [ˈprɔntki] is a village in the administrative district of Gmina Białe Błota, within Bydgoszcz County, Kuyavian-Pomeranian Voivodeship, in north-central Poland.
