= Łochowice, Kuyavian-Pomeranian Voivodeship =

Łochowice
- Village
- Location within Poland
- Coordinates: 53°8′3″N 17°47′57″E
- Country: Poland
- Voivodeship: Kuyavian-Pomeranian
- County: Bydgoszcz
- Gmina: Białe Błota

Łochowice ([wɔxɔˈvit͡sɛ] German: Lochowitze, 1939–45 Lochwitz) is a village in the administrative district of Gmina Białe Błota, within Bydgoszcz County, Kuyavian-Pomeranian Voivodeship, in north-central Poland.
