= Lisi Ogon =

- Village
- Location within Poland
- Coordinates: 53°7′40″N 17°52′58″E
- Country: Poland
- Voivodeship: Kuyavian-Pomeranian
- County: Bydgoszcz
- Gmina: Białe Błota

Lisi Ogon [ˈliɕi ˈɔɡɔn] is a village in the administrative district of Gmina Białe Błota, within Bydgoszcz County, Kuyavian-Pomeranian Voivodeship, in north-central Poland.
