= Łochowo, Kuyavian-Pomeranian Voivodeship =

Łochowo
- Village
- Location within Poland
- Coordinates: 53°7′20″N 17°50′20″E
- Country: Poland
- Voivodeship: Kuyavian-Pomeranian
- County: Bydgoszcz
- Gmina: Białe Błota
- Population: 2,600

Łochowo [wɔˈxɔvɔ] is a village in the administrative district of Gmina Białe Błota, within Bydgoszcz County, Kuyavian-Pomeranian Voivodeship, in north-central Poland.
