= Yank (disambiguation) =

Yank is a shortened form of Yankee, a slang term for US citizens.

Yank or Yanks may also refer to:

== Sports teams ==
- Boston Yanks, a National Football League team from 1944 to 1948
- New York Yanks, a National Football League team in 1950 and 1951, originally the Boston Yanks
- New York Yankees, a Major League Baseball team nicknamed the "Yanks"
- An infrequent nickname of the United States men's national soccer team

== Arts and entertainment ==
- Yanks, a 1979 film
- The Yank, a 2014 American comedy film
- Yank!, an off-Broadway play about homosexual soldiers in World War II
- Yank, a 1940s comic book superhero - see Yank & Doodle
- Billy Yank, a protagonist in the 1950s comic strip Johnny Reb and Billy Yank

== People ==
- Yank (nickname)
- Yank Porter (c. 1895–1944), American jazz drummer

== Transportation and vehicles ==
- USS Yank (SP-908), a US Navy patrol vessel from 1917 to 1919
- Yank (automobile), an unsuccessful American sports car produced in 1950
- Yank, nickname for the Queensland AC16 class locomotive
- The Yank, nickname of the prototype for the Waveney-class lifeboat

== Other uses ==
- Yank, the Army Weekly, a magazine for American soldiers during World War II
- Yanks Air Museum, Chino, California
- Yank (physics), a rarely used unit in physics

== See also ==
- Yankee (disambiguation)
