= Yankin =

Yankin may refer to:

- Yankin Township, a township of Yangon, Myanmar (Burma)
  - Yankin Education College, a college located in the township
- "Yankin", a song by American rapper Lady from her album Bitch From Around The Way 2

== See also ==
- Yank (disambiguation)
