= Yank (nickname) =

Yank is a nickname for:

- Yank Adams (1847–1923), American professional carom billiards player specializing in finger billiards
- Yank Azman (born 1947), Canadian television and movie actor
- Yank Barry (born 1948), Canadian musician and businessman
- Charles A. Bernier (1890–1963), American football, basketball and baseball player, coach and college administrator
- Irwin Boyd (1908–1979), American National Hockey League player
- Robert B. "Yank" Heisler (1949–2017), American retired business executive and current university dean
- Yank Lawson (1911–1995), American jazz trumpeter
- Yank Levy (1897–1965), Canadian soldier, military instructor and author of one of the first manuals on guerrilla warfare
- Yank Rachell (1910–1997), American country blues mandolin and guitar player
- Yank Robinson (1857–1894), American Major League Baseball player
- Yank Terry (1911–1979), American Major League Baseball pitcher
- Wayne Warren (born 1962), Welsh darts player
- Stan Yerkes (1874–1940), American Major League Baseball pitcher

== See also ==
- Danny Culloty, American-born former Gaelic football player nicknamed "The Yank"
- Bianca Hammett (born 1990), Australian synchronised swimmer nicknamed "Yanks"
