= Allen & Ginter =

American tobacco company

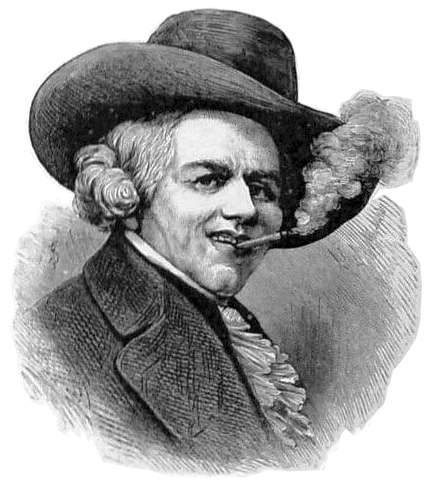
- The "Old Planter" that identified Allen & Ginter
- Type: Private
- Industry: Tobacco
- Founded: c. 1880
- Founder: John F. Allen, Lewis Ginter
- Defunct: 1890; 136 years ago
- Fate: Merged with other companies to form American Tobacco Co.
- Headquarters: Richmond, Virginia, USA
- Products: Cigarettes, Pipe tobacco
- Brands: Dandies; Little Beauties; Perfection; Richmond Gems; Virginia Brights

Allen & Ginter was a Richmond, Virginia tobacco manufacturing company formed by John F. Allen and Lewis Ginter around 1880. The firm created and marketed the first cigarette cards for collecting and trading in the United States. Some of the notable cards in the series include baseball players Charles Comiskey, Cap Anson, and Jack Glasscock, as well as non-athletes like Buffalo Bill Cody.

The company merged with four other tobacco manufacturers to form the American Tobacco Company in 1890. Since 2006, a revived version of the brand has been issued by Topps for a line of baseball cards.

== History ==
=== Tobacco manufacturing ===
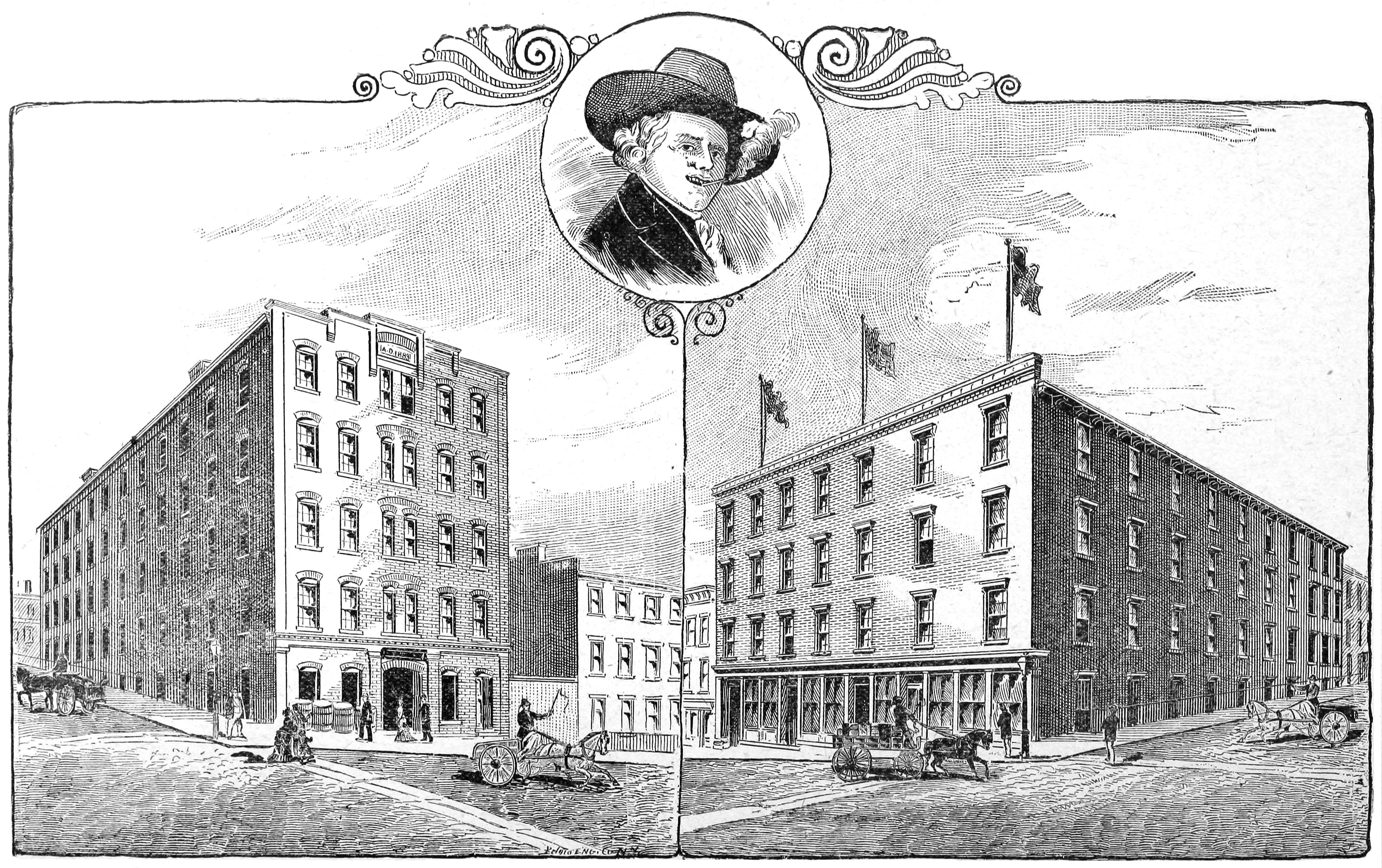
Engraving of the Allen & Ginter warehouses in Richmond, Virginia, from an 1886 promotional book

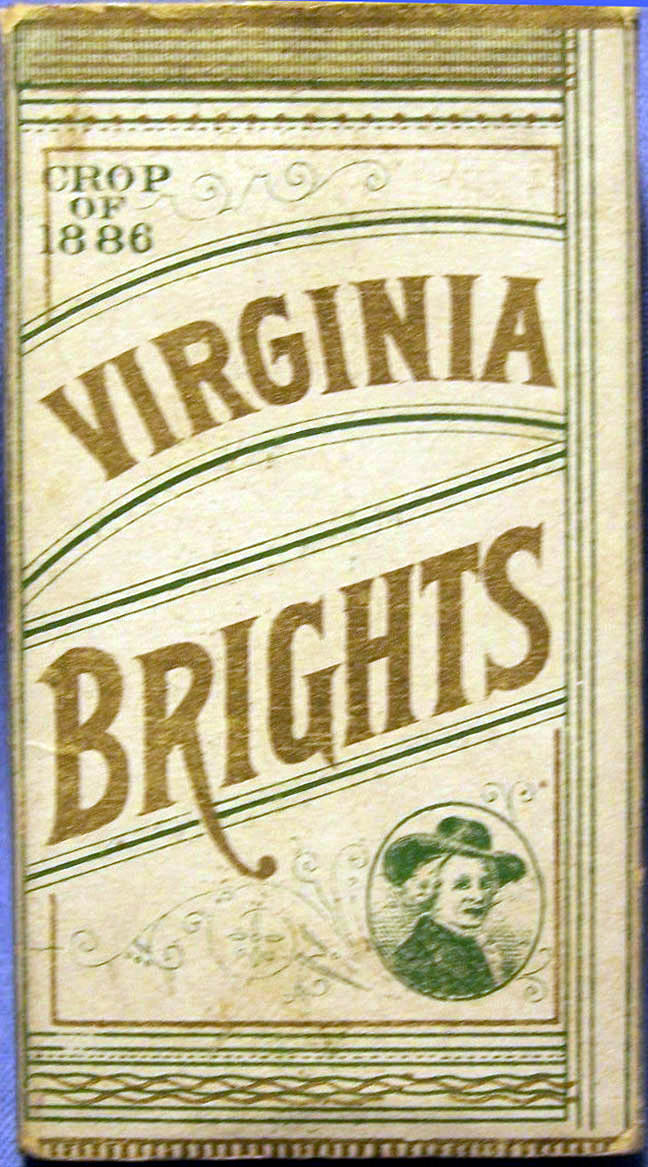
Virginia Brights cigarette box by Allen & Ginter, c. 1888

The firm of Allen & Ginter, born around 1880, was the rebranding of John F. Allen & Company, a partnership formed about eight years earlier by John F. Allen and Lewis Ginter. When Allen retired in 1882, Ginter took on John Pope as his new partner but kept Allen's name. The first tobacco company to employ female labor, by 1886, they had 1,100 employees, predominantly girls, who rolled the cigarettes.

Around 1876, the company offered a prize for the invention of a machine able to roll cigarettes (which until then had been hand-rolled). In 1880, James Albert Bonsack of Virginia invented a cigarette rolling machine. Because it was not completely reliable, all but one of the large tobacco manufacturers declined to buy the machine. James Buchanan Duke did buy this cigarette rolling machine in 1885 and used it to great success; by 1890 he had consolidated his four major competitors, including Allen & Ginter, and formed the American Tobacco Company. The "Allen & Ginter Company" was no more, but Lewis Ginter sat on the board of the American Tobacco Company.

The cigarette brands of Allen & Ginter included Richmond Gems, Virginia Brights, Perfection, Dandies and Little Beauties.

In 1890, Allen & Ginter, along with other companies of the United States (W. Duke & Sons, W.S. Kimball & Company, Kinney Tobacco, and Goodwin & Company) formed the American Tobacco Company, in an attempt to compete against British tobacco companies.

=== Collectible cards ===
In late 1880s, Allen & Ginter began to release cigarette card sets as stiffeners for the tobacco package and promotional items for its cigarette brands. The most part of the collection consisted of illustrated cards, but there were a few collections of photographs. Topics varied from birds and wild animals to American Indian chiefs or flags of the world. Allen & Ginter's baseball cards were the first of the tobacco era baseball cards ever produced for distribution on a national level. The most popular and highly sought after of these sets is the N28 and N29 "World's Champions" series, released in 1887.

In 1887, Allen & Ginter released its iconic "World's Champions" set, featuring not only baseball players but also athletes from various sports and notable public figures. These cards were illustrated, featuring vibrant chromolithographic printing.

Players like Cap Anson and King Kelly became some of the earliest sports celebrities immortalized through Allen & Ginter’s cards. Allen & Ginter's influence extended beyond just baseball, inspiring future tobacco companies and card manufacturers to produce similar sets. Today, Allen & Ginter's cards are valued among collectors for their historical significance and artistry.

=== Modern era ===
Allen & Ginter (brand)
- Product type: Trading cards
- Current owner: Topps
- Country: United States
- Introduced: 2006; 20 years ago
- Related brands: Topps
- Website: Allen & Ginter collection

In 2006, Topps, a leading producer of confectionery and trading cards, resurrected the Allen & Ginter brand name to produce a series of illustrated trading cards, mostly focused on baseball sets. Nevertheless, the first couple of years of the product's inception saw the inclusion of several other sports figures such as Jennie Finch (softball), Brandi Chastain and Mia Hamm (soccer), Hulk Hogan (wrestling), Danica Patrick (auto racing), Leon Spinks (boxing), Randy Couture (mixed martial arts), Misty May-Treanor (beach volleyball) and Dennis Rodman (basketball).

Allen & Ginter cards began to feature hand-painted cards of current baseball players as well as various insert sets featuring standout athletes in other sports, pop culture icons, and historical figures ranging from Wee-Man to Davy Crockett and everything in between.

Non-sports trading cards issued by Topps included personalities such as Robert E. Lee, Thomas Edison, Billy the Kid and Andrew Carnegie, Davy Crockett, among others.

From 2006 to 2009, artist Dick Perez was commissioned to hand paint special one of one insert cards in the style of Allen & Ginter. Perez created 30 art cards each of those years featuring the prominent stars of the game.

As of 2012 the Allen & Ginter series remains one of Topps' most popular, highest selling brands in their product lineup.

The most prominent Allen & Ginter insert sets are the DNA Hair Relic cards, which include strands of hair attributed to historical figures such as Abraham Lincoln, King George III, George Washington, among others.

Another popular feature of the Allen & Ginter product is the Rip Card. Invented by hobby shop owner and Topps consultant Alan Narz, Rip Cards have been a part of every Allen & Ginter product since 2006. These cards allow collectors to keep the card intact or to rip the outer card to reveal an exclusive mini card available only inside of a Rip Card. These mini cards may be short prints, autographs, or cards made from metal or wood. Beginning in 2013, Topps began including a Double Rip Card, which had two inner cavities with mini cards inside. In 2019, Topps introduced a jumbo Box Topper Rip Card, with 3 mini cards inside.

== Trading cards series ==
There were various cigarette card sets released as promotional items for these products. The most popular and highly sought after of these sets is the N28 and N29 "World's Champions" series, released in 1887.

Some of the series released were (all illustrations, except where noted):

- A25: World's Inventors
- N1: American Editors
- N2: American Indian Chiefs
- N3: Arms of All Nations
- N4: Birds of America
- N5: Birds of the Tropics
- N6: City Flags
- N8: 50 Fish From American Waters
- N9: Flags of All Nations
- N10: Flags of All Nations 2
- N11: Flags of the States and Territories
- N12: Fruits
- N13: Game birds
- N14: General Government and State Capitol Buildings
- N15: Great Generals
- N16: Natives in Costumes
- N17: Naval Flags
- N18: Parasol Drills
- N19: Pirates of the Spanish
- N21: 50 Quadrupeds
- N22: Racing Colors of the World
- N23: Song Birds of the World
- N24: Types of All Nations
- N25: Wild Animals of the World
- N26: World's Beauties (Note: Photographic cards.)
- N27: World's Beauties 2
- N28: World's Champions
- N29: World's Champions 2
- N30: World's Decorations
- N31: World's Dudes
- N32: World's Racers
- N33: World's Smokers
- N34: World's Sovereigns
- N35: American Editors 2
- N36: American Indian Chiefs 2
- N37: Birds of America 2
- N38: Birds of the Tropics 2
- N40: Game Birds
- N42: Song Birds of the World
- N43: World's Champions 2
- N45: Actors and Actresses
- N46: Cigarette Making Girls
- N47: Dogs ^{1}
- N48: Girl Baseball Players
- N49: Girl Cyclists
- N57: Actresses
- N58: Girls and Children (Note: For Our Litte Beauties cigarettes.)
- N59: Girls
- N60: Actresses and Celebrities
- N64: Girls and Children (Note: For Virginia Brights cigarettes.)
- N65: Girls and Children (Note: For Richmond cigarettes.)
- N67: Actresses 2

Notes

Cigarette cards gallery
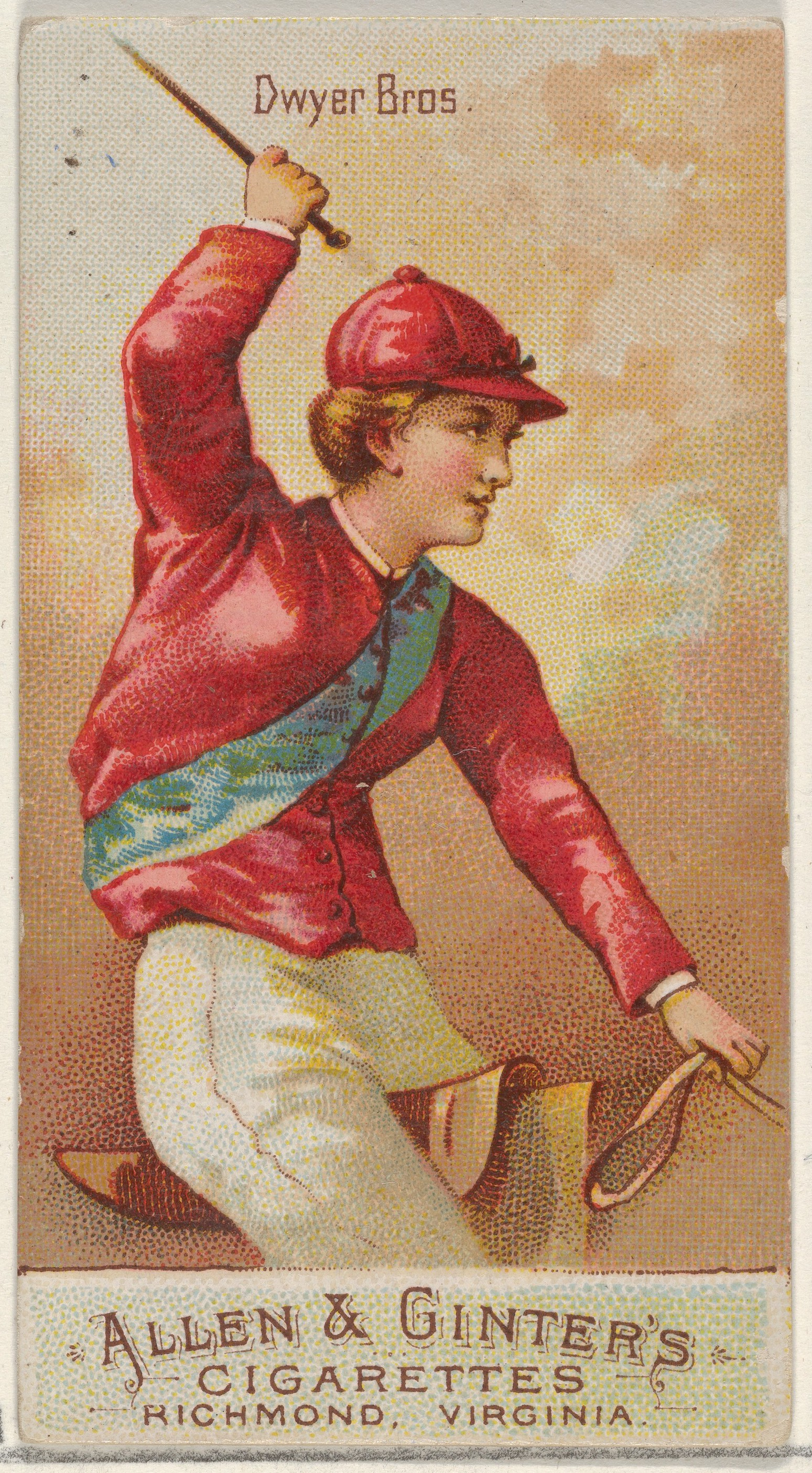
Dwyer Brothers (Racing Colors of the World

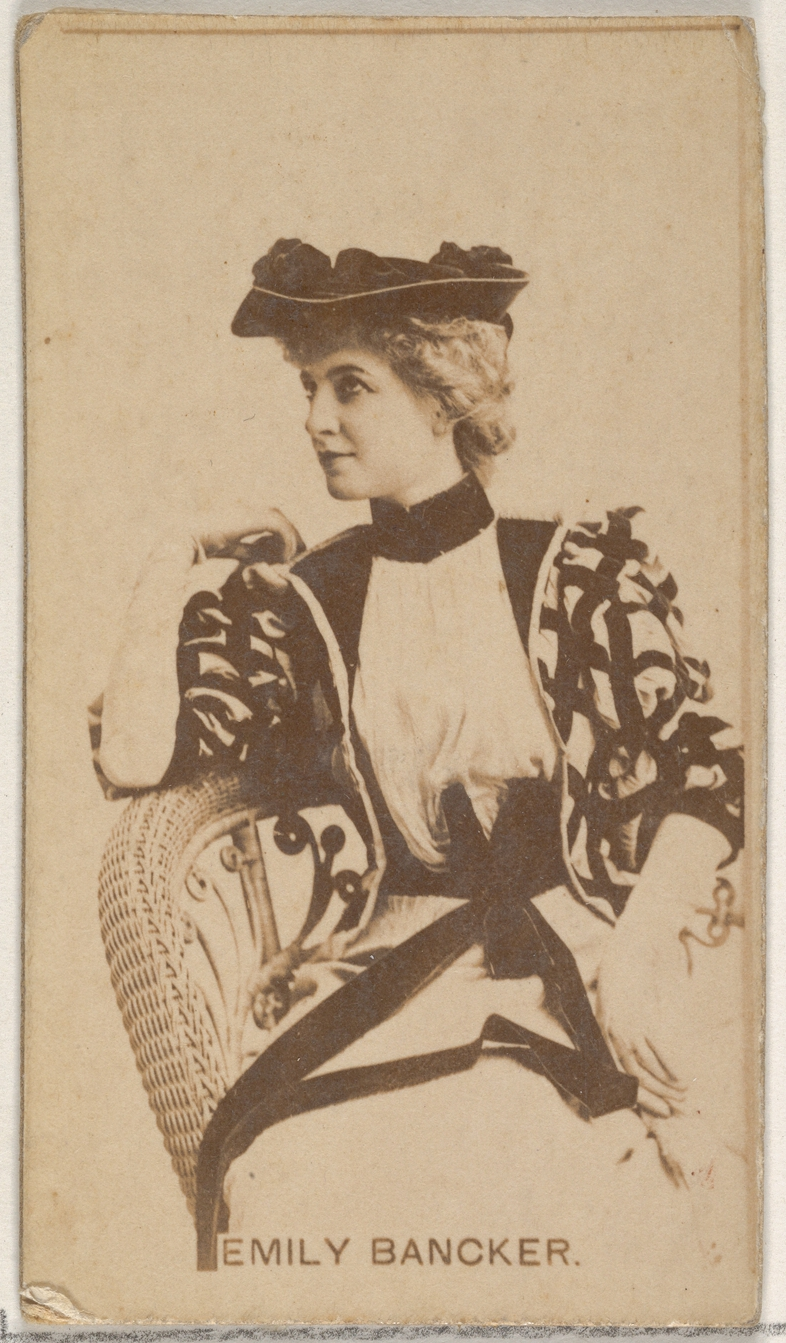
Emily Bancker (Actors and Actresses)

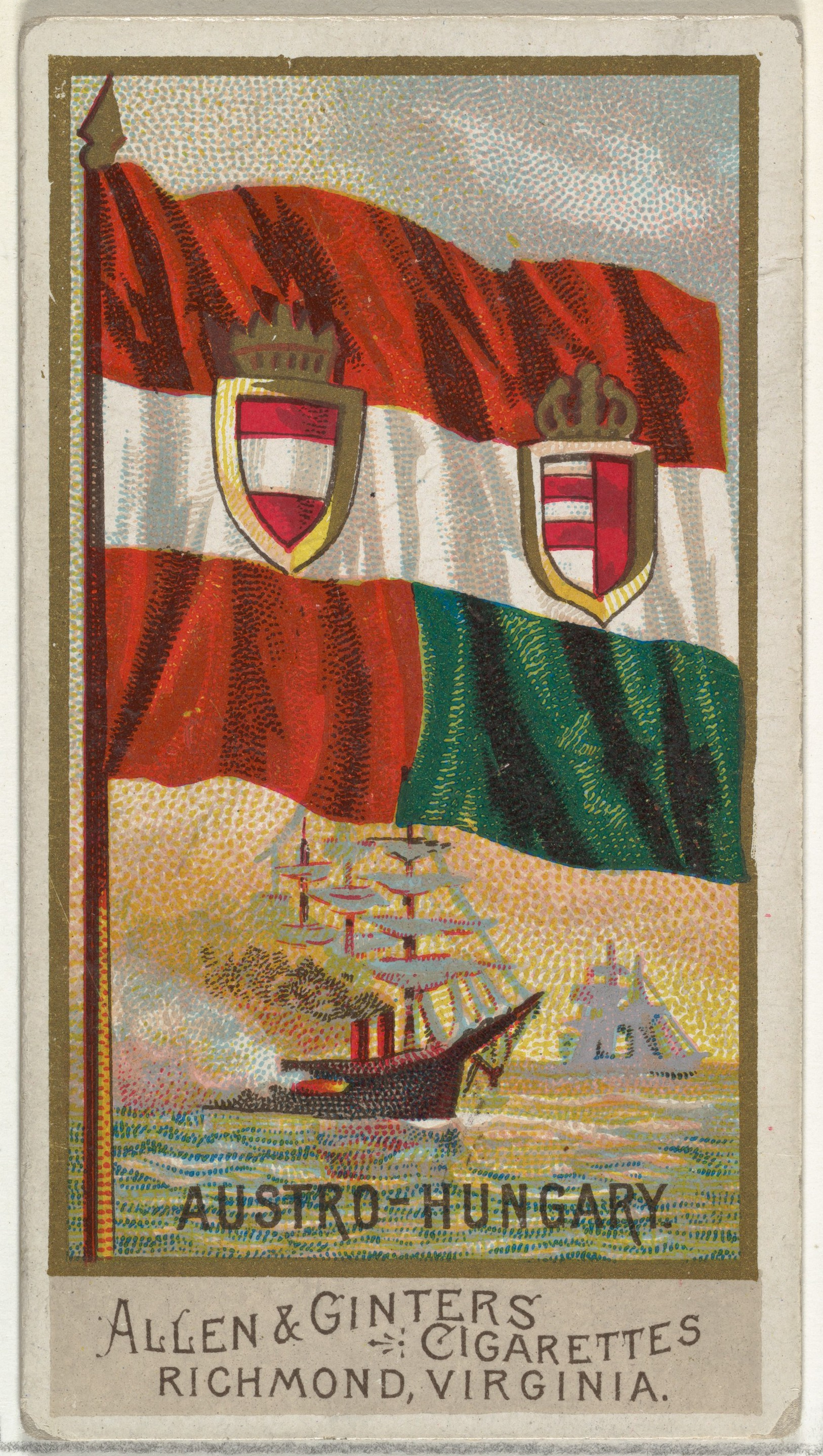
Austria-Hungary (Flags of All Nations)

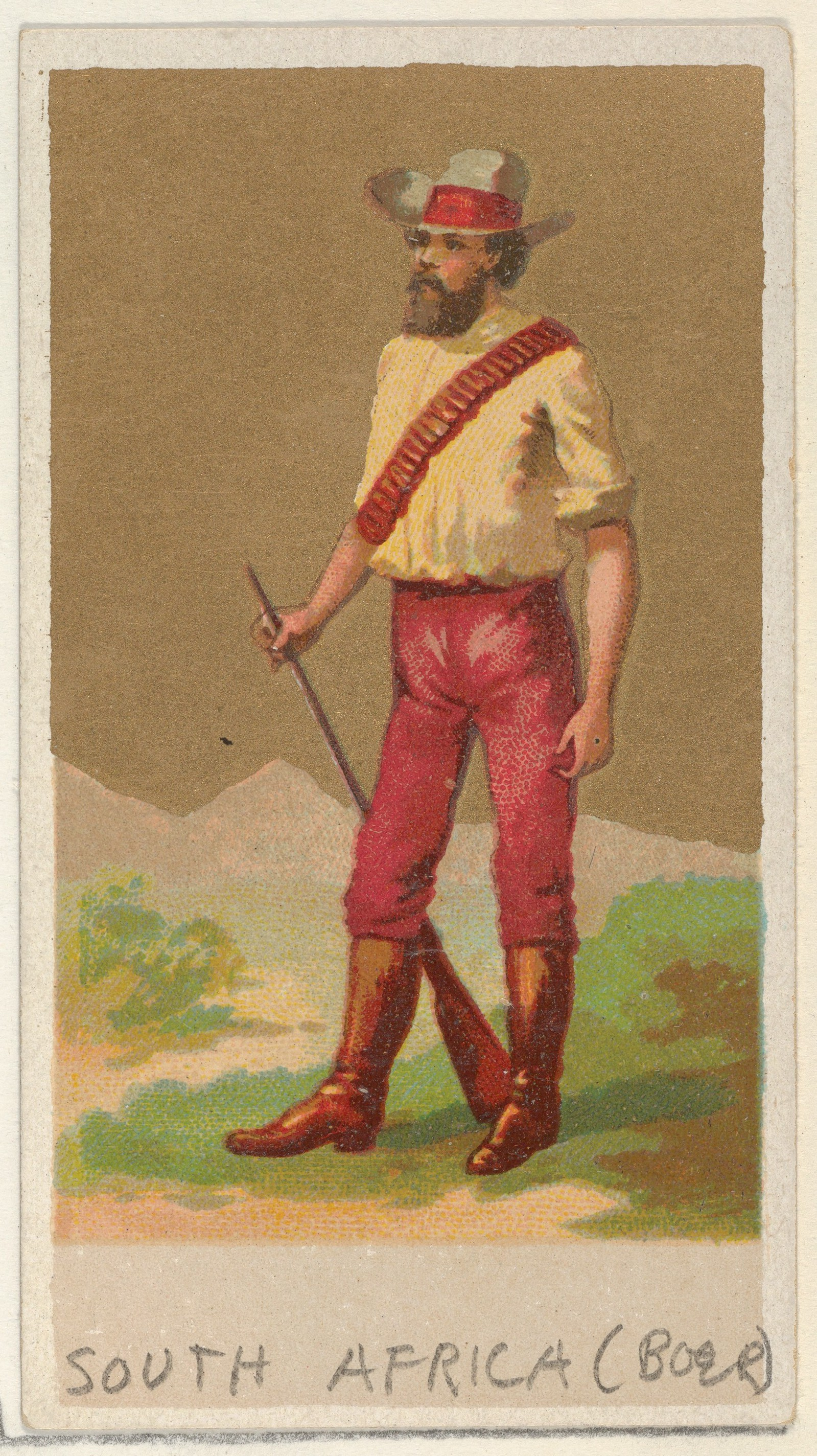
Boer (Natives in Costume)

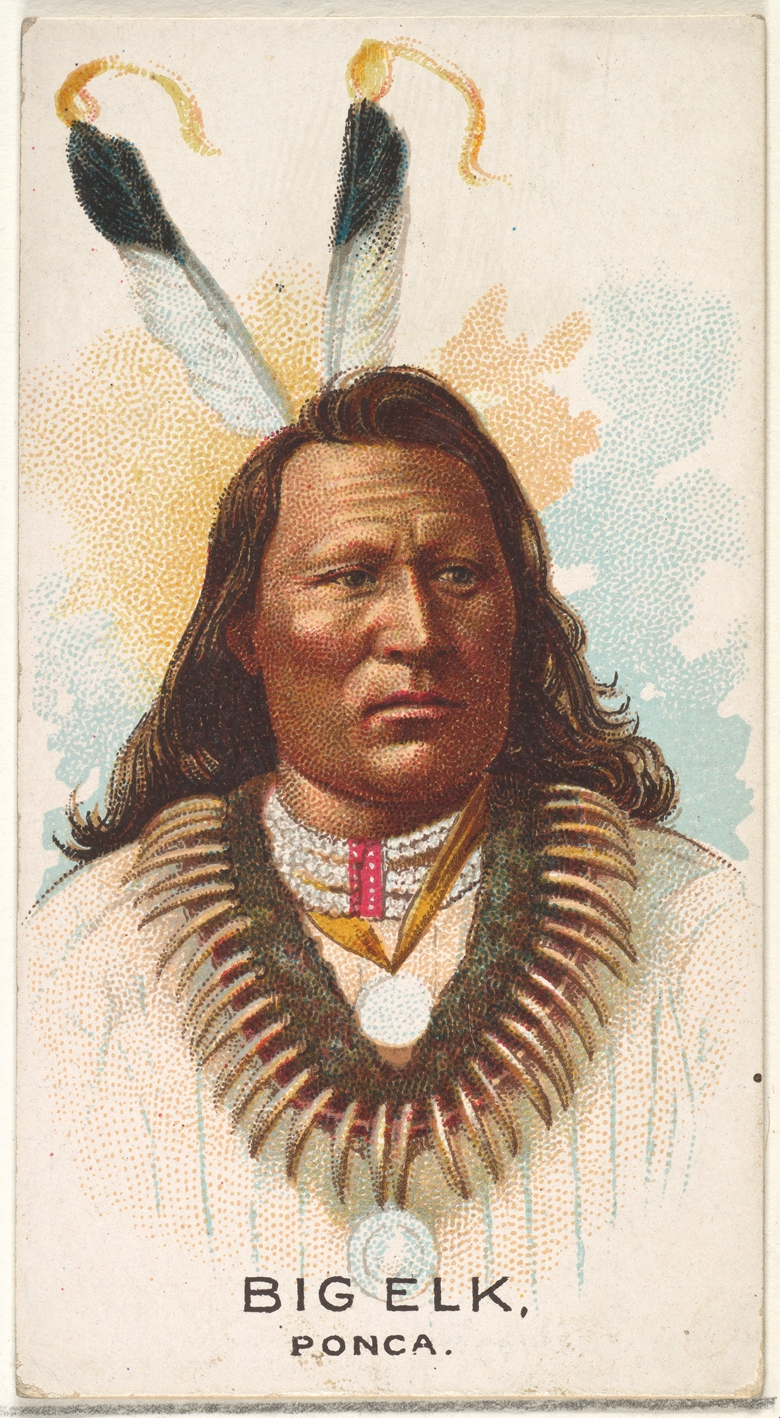
Big Elk (Indian Chiefs of America)

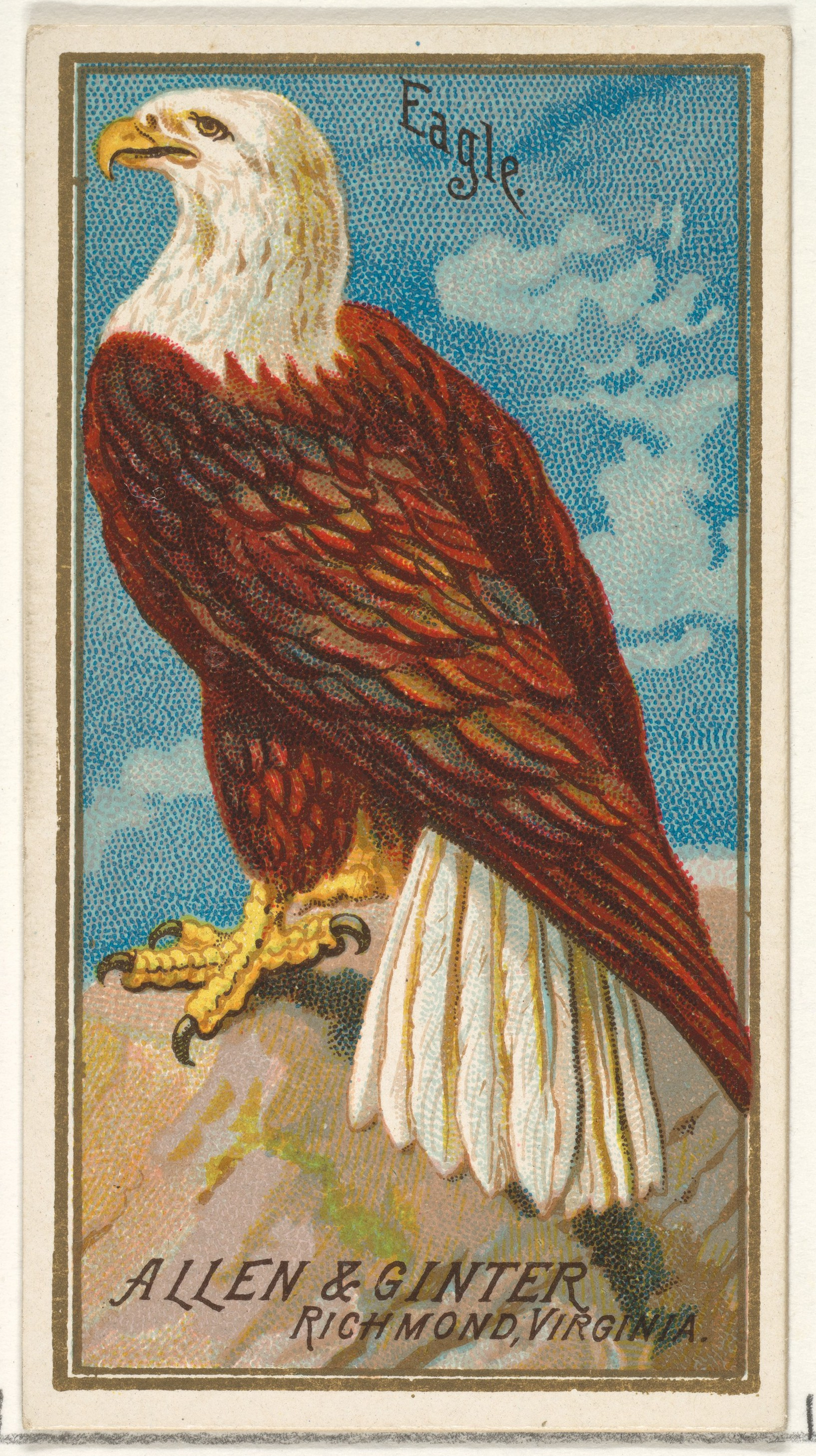
Bald eagle (Birds of America)

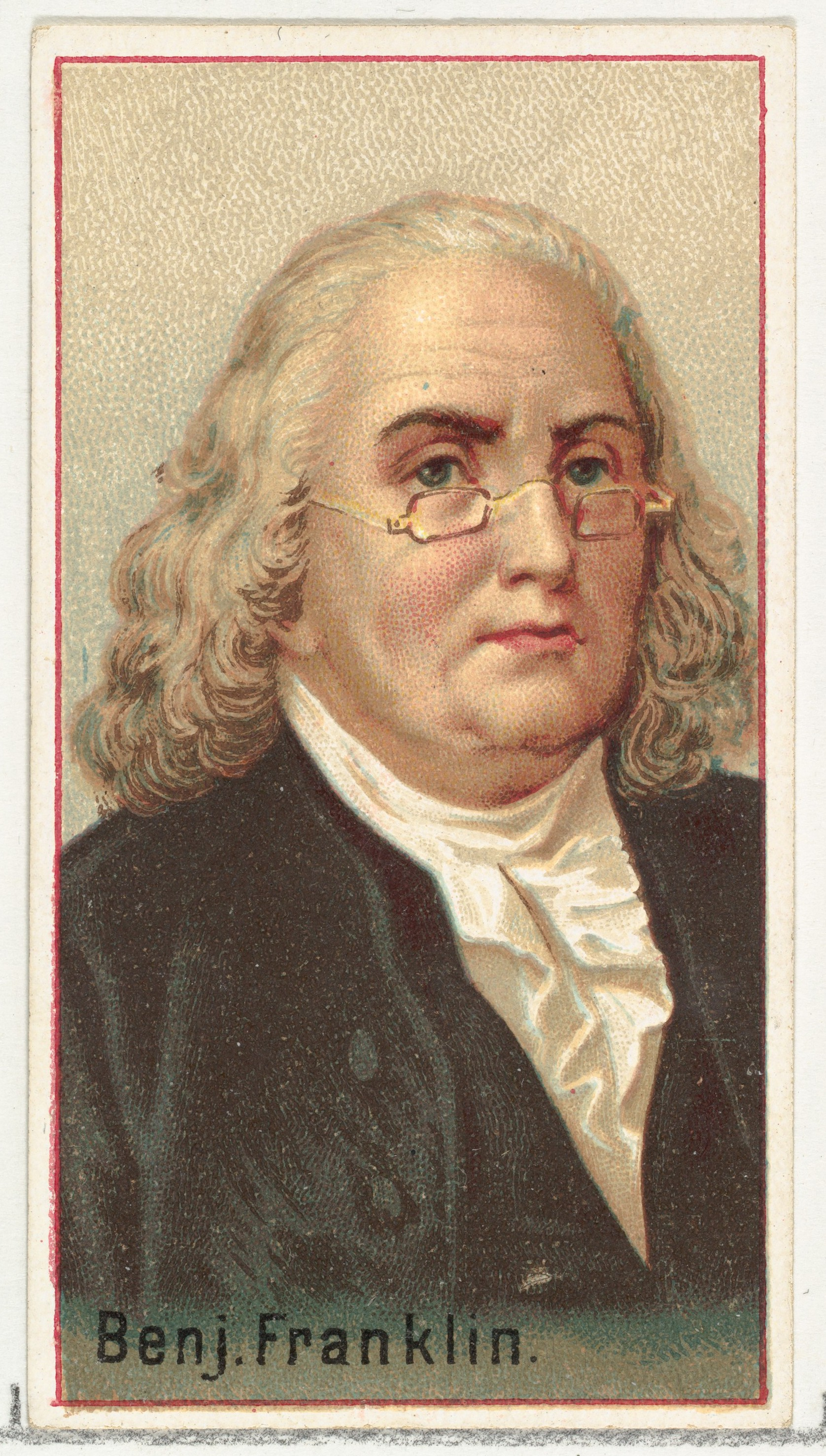
Benjamin Franklin (World's Inventors)

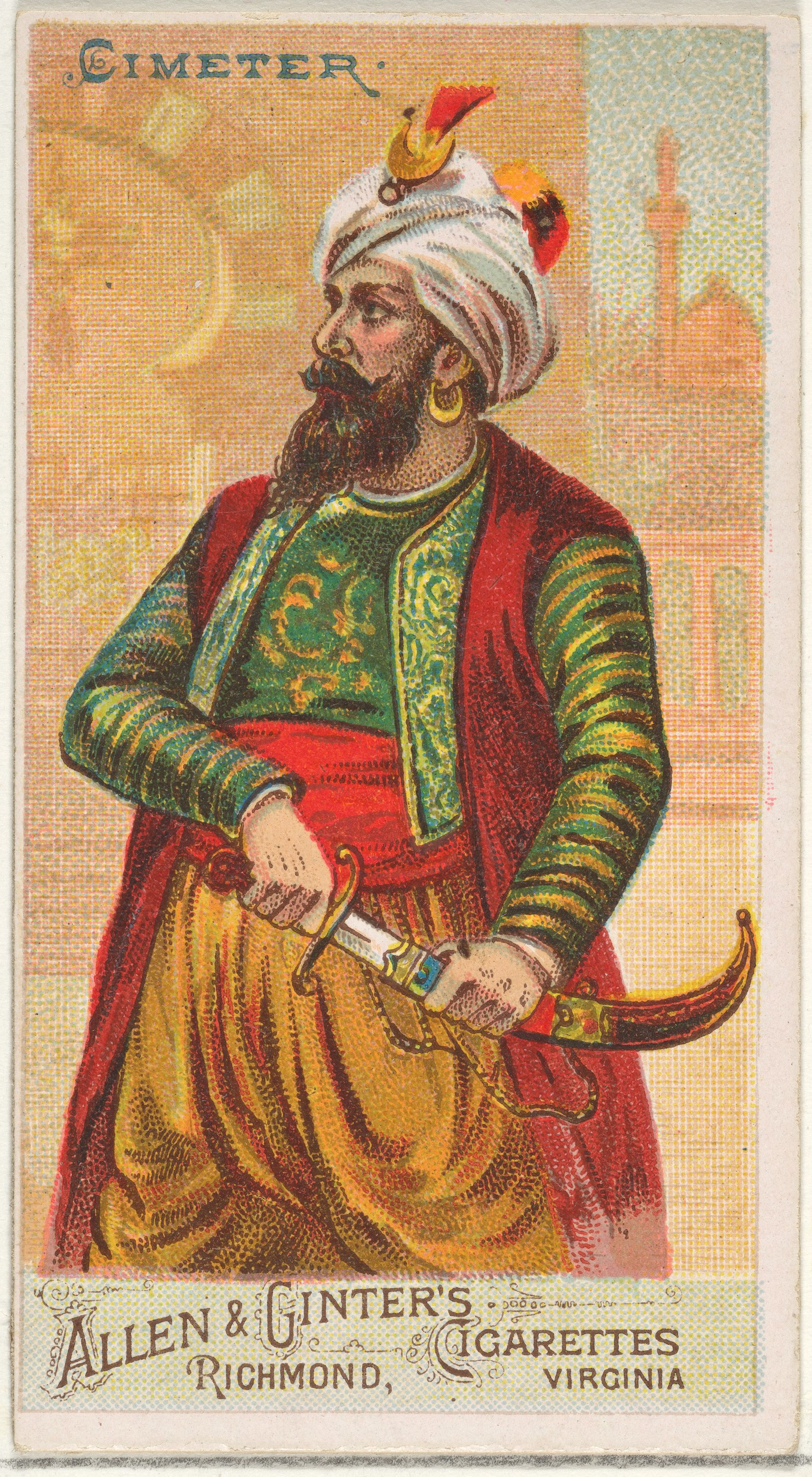
Cimiter (Arms of All Nations)

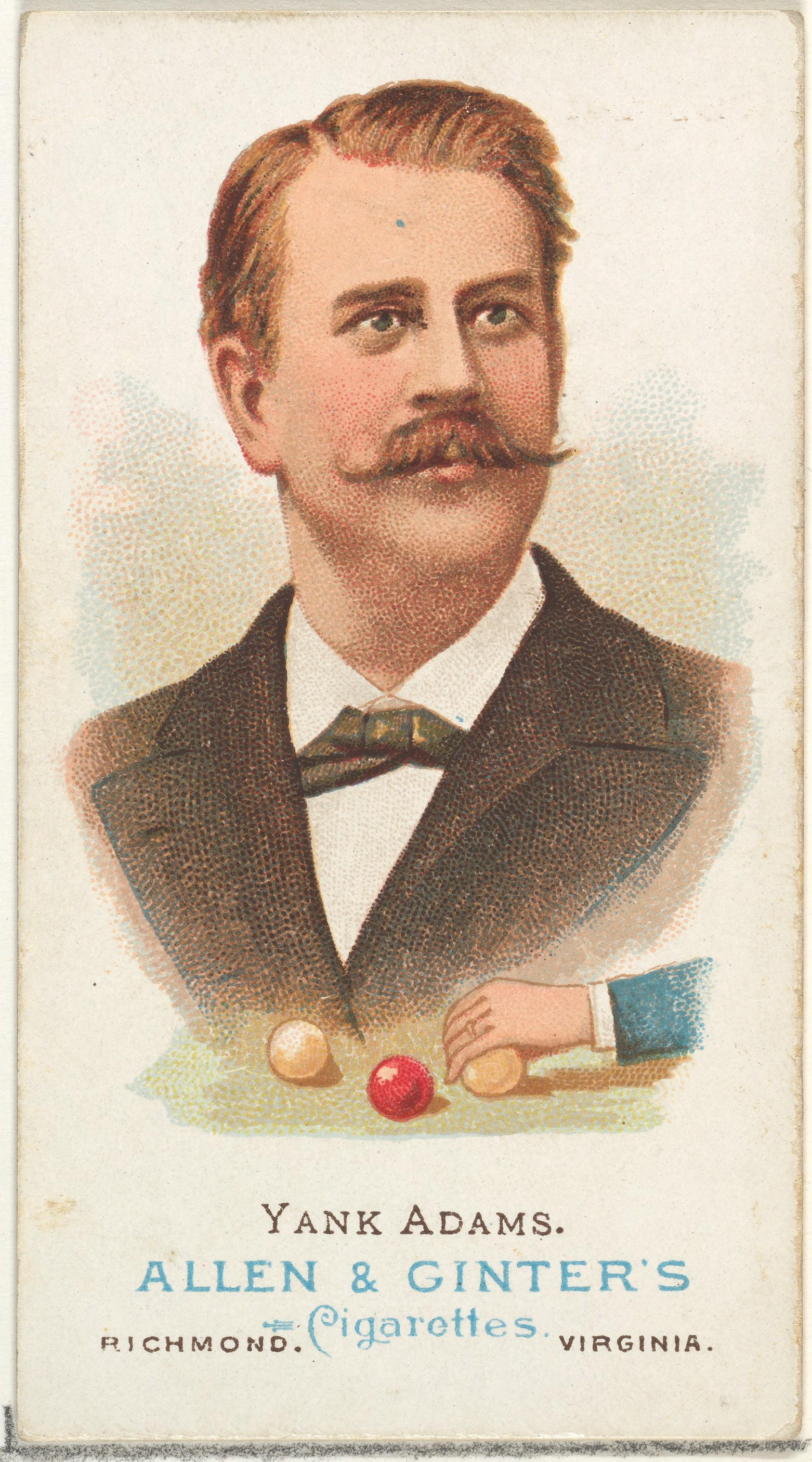
Yank Adams (World's Champions)

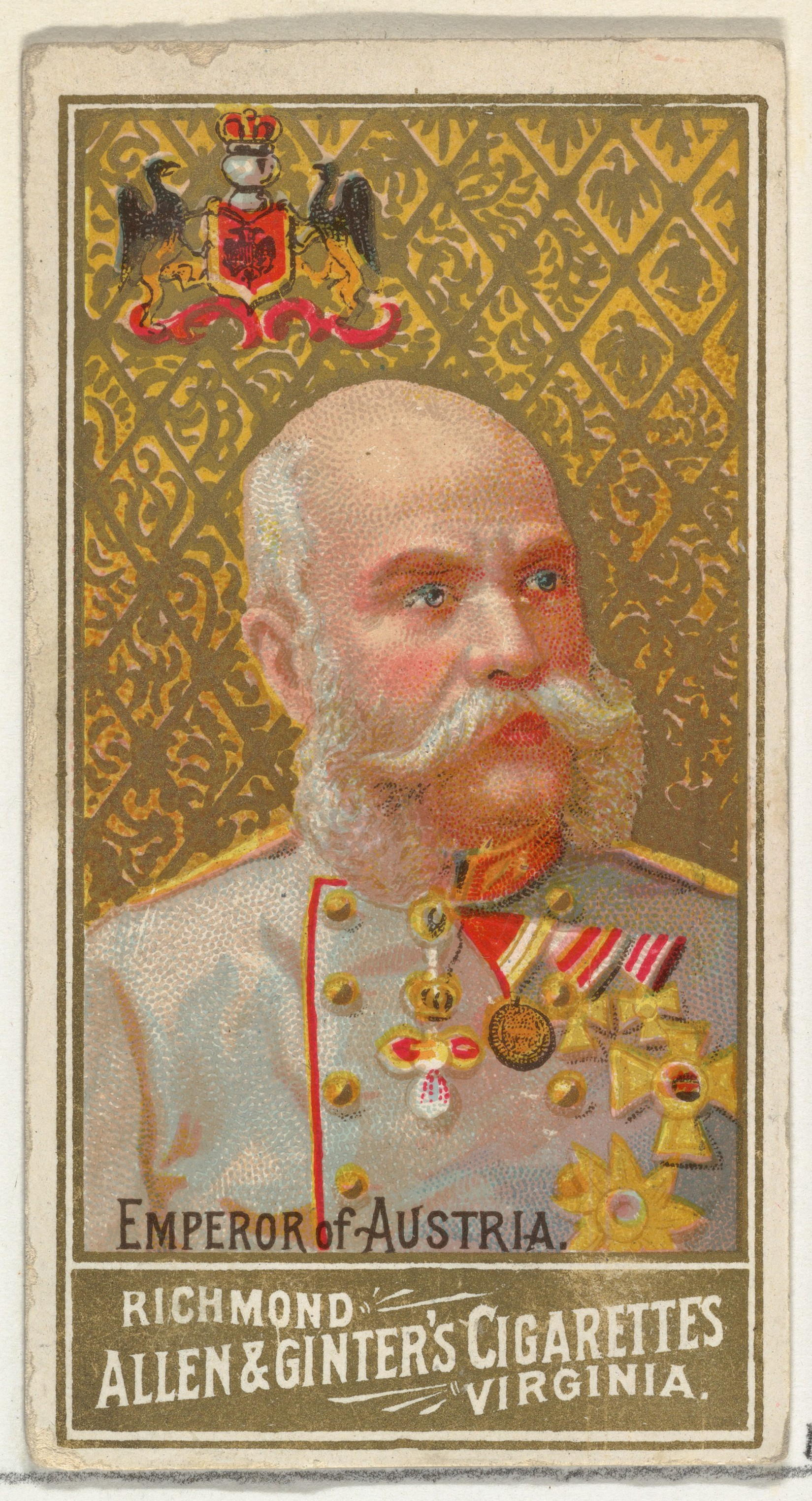
Franz Joseph I, (World's Sovereigns)

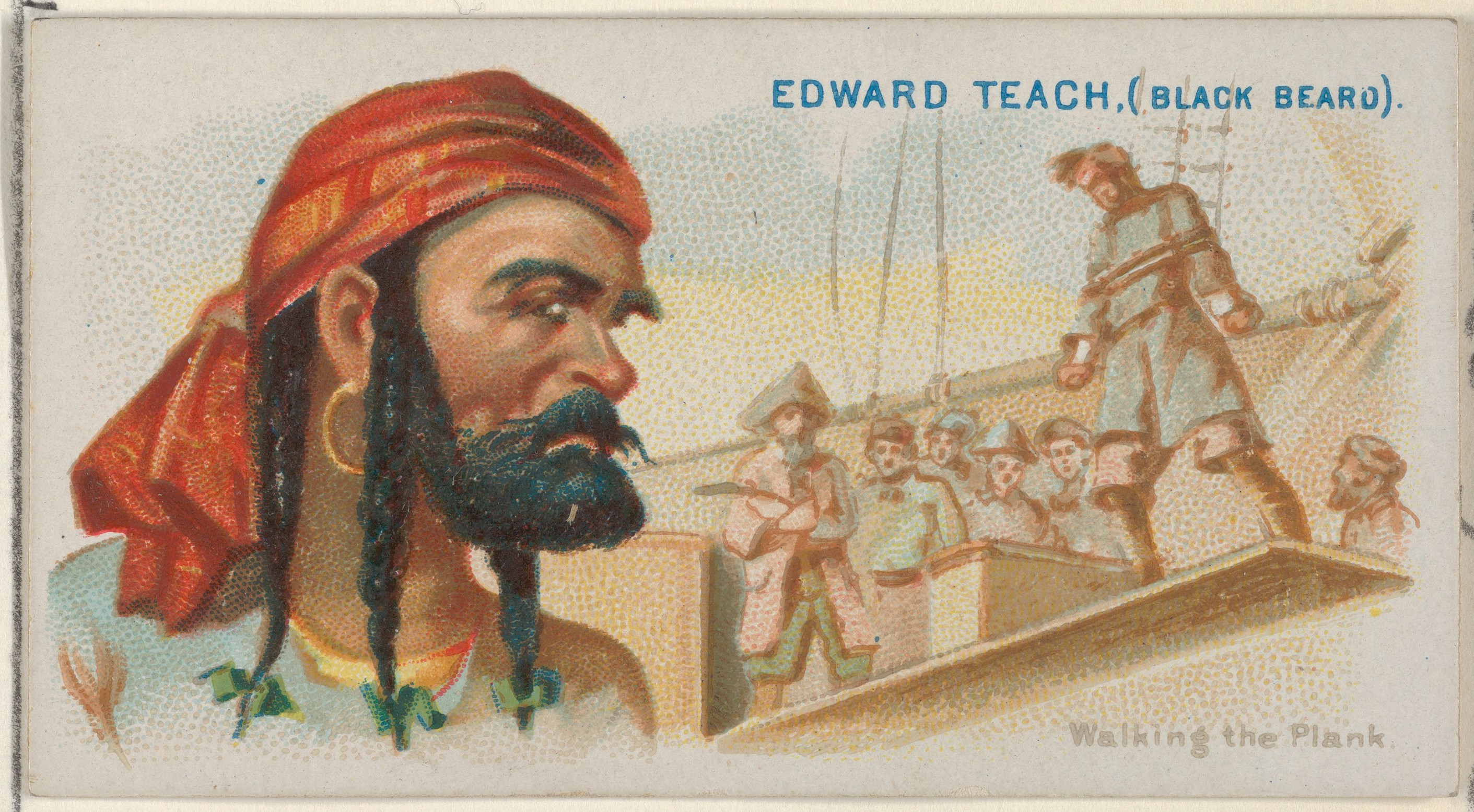
Edward Teach (Pirates of the Spanish)

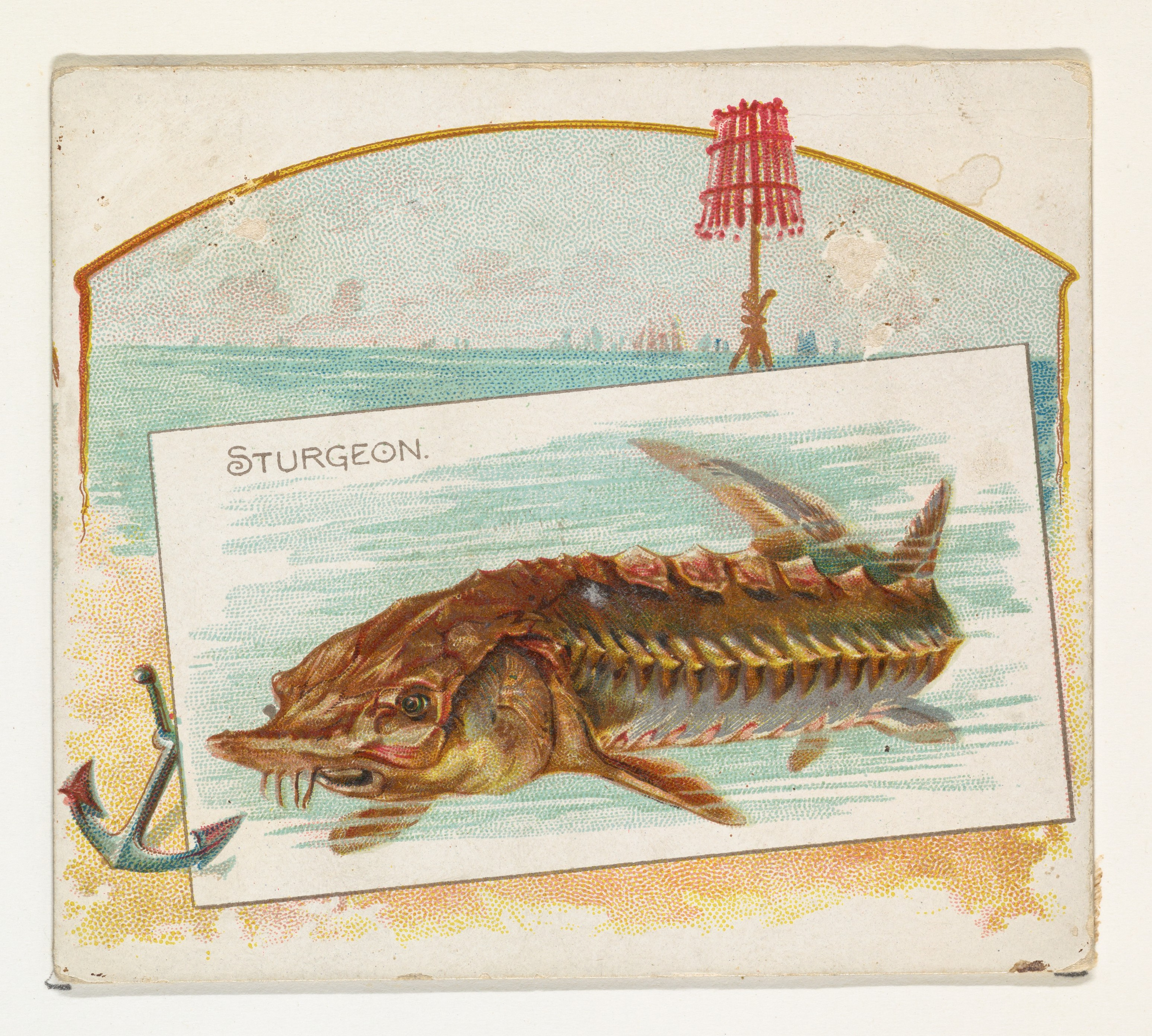
Sturgeon (American Waters)

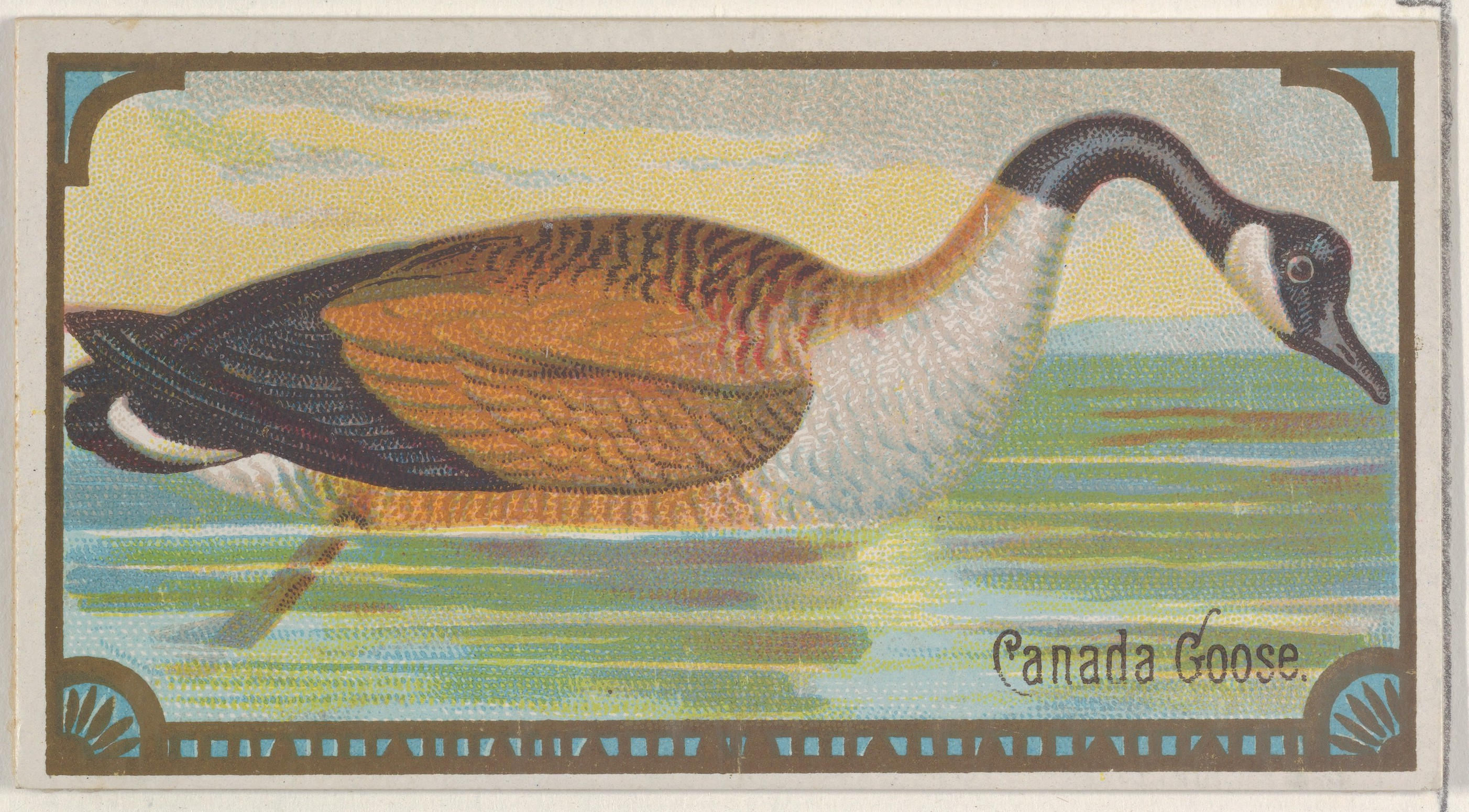
Canada Goose from Game Bird series (1889)
