= USS Yank =

Patrol vessel of the United States Navy

History

United States
- Name: USS Yank
- Namesake: Previous name retained
- Builder: Julius Peterson, Nyack, New York
- Completed: 1917
- Acquired: 8 October 1917
- Commissioned: 10 October 1917
- Stricken: 14 February 1919
- Fate: Returned to owner 14 February 1919

General characteristics
- Type: Patrol vessel
- Length: 60 ft 1.5 in (18.326 m)
- Beam: 10 ft (3.0 m)
- Draft: 3 ft (0.91 m) mean
- Speed: 18.25 knots
- Complement: 10
- Armament: 1 × 1-pounder gun; 1 × .30-caliber (7.62-millimeter) machine gun

USS Yank (SP-908) was an armed motorboat that served in the United States Navy as a patrol vessel from 1917 to 1919.

Yank was a motorboat built in 1917 by Julius Peterson at Nyack, New York. She was acquired by the U.S. Navy for World War I service on 8 October 1917 from Mr. N. Ackerman of New York City and commissioned on 10 October 1917.

Assigned to the 3rd Naval District, Yank patrolled the coast of Rhode Island and Connecticut for the rest of the participation of the United States in World War I.

Yank briefly remained on the Navy Directory after the armistice on 11 November 1918 but was finally returned to her former owner on 14 February 1919. Her name was simultaneously struck from the Navy List.

== See also ==
- USS Yankee
