= USS Yankee =

USS Yankee has been the name of two ships in the United States Navy.

- USS Yankee (1861), a steam-powered sidewheel tugboat in commission from 1861 to 1865
- USS Yankee (1892), an auxiliary cruiser and transport used in the Spanish–American War and in commission from 1898 to 1899, from 1903 to 1906, and in 1908

== See also ==
- USS Yank (SP-908)
