= Yank (automobile) =

1950 automobile made by Custom Auto Works

The Yank was a vehicle made by Custom Auto Works, a company based in San Diego, California, in 1950. Being what could be described as a poor man's sports car, it was an inexpensive, though rather attractive, aluminum-bodied car. It was powered by a 63 brake horsepower (47 kW), 134.2-cubic-inch-displacement Willys four-cylinder L-head engine mated to a three-speed manual transmission. It cost $1,000 from the factory, weighed 1,500 pounds (680 kg), and had a wheelbase of 100 inches (2,540 mm).
