= Peterson family, Bydgoszcz =

Polish family, politician, entrepreneurs, Bydgoszcz, Poland, 18th–19th century

Peterson
- Family
- Current region: Kingdom of Prussia, Poland
- Origin: Kołobrzeg, Bydgoszcz
- Members: Ernst Conrad, Ernst Emil, Ernst Heinrich, Julius

The Peterson family was a family whose several members had a historical importance in the city of Bydgoszcz, Poland. They were influential from the beginning of the 19th century till the 1930s in the area of politics, engineering and entrepreneurship.

== Ernst Conrad Peterson (1778–1841) ==
=== Early life ===
Ernst Conrad was born on June 18, 1778, in Kołobrzeg. He was the son of Johann Gottfried, a master bricklayer and Dorotha Elisabeth née Mursinna, his second wife.

His grandfather Martin Fryderyk, moved from Berlin to Kołobrzeg (then Kolberg) to work as a bricklayer. His father Johann Gottfried was in 1770 a builder involved in the construction of a bridge over the Netze river near Nakel and then in the leveling of the Bydgoszcz Canal. After a long period of employment in the network regulation between Nakel and Czarnikau, Johann Gottfried was employed as a master builder in Pomerania.

Ernst Conrad learned the construction craft with his father. In 1792, he began to study the works carried out by the city architect Wibelitz in Białogard. In 1795, he received a professional passport (Polish: paszport podwodowy) as a surveyor's assistant; on October 22, he was employed in a topographic survey of South Prussia.

In 1796, he came to Bydgoszcz for the first time, invited by his half-brother Johann Philip, who worked there as a builder and had been supervising the extension and repair of the Bydgoszcz Canal, under the guidance of his mentor David Gilly. Initially, he worked on the site as a construction apprentice. From 1797 to 1799, he was employed in the measurement of the Drwęca river carried out in connection with the construction of the Ostróda-Elbląg canal. He worked further up to the mouth of the Vistula river.

In the years 1799–1801, Conrad studied at the Building Academy in Berlin, where he approached master architect David Gilly. Eventually, he received a license to conduct independent construction works.

=== Inspector of the Bydgoszcz Canal ===
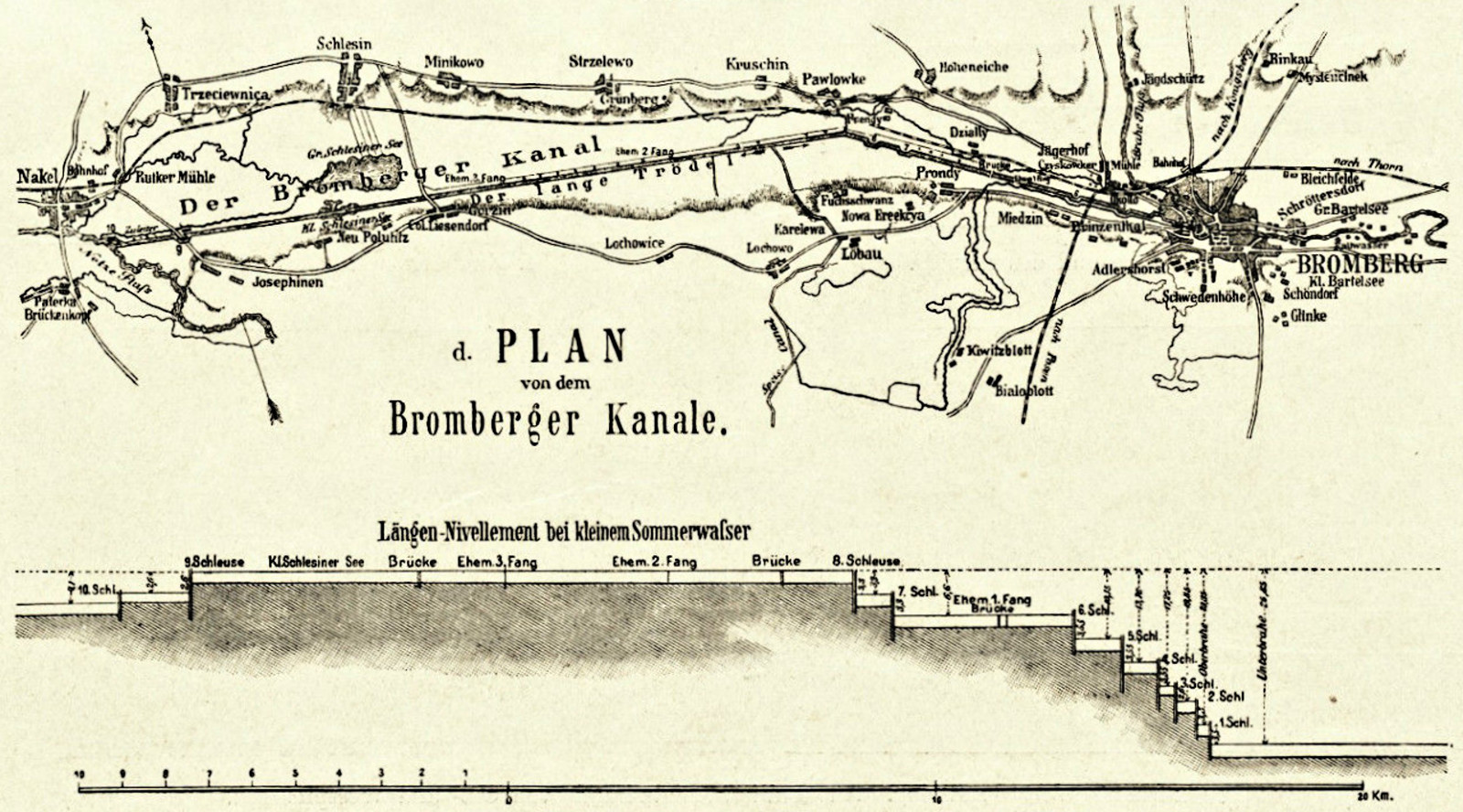
German plan of the Bydgoszcz Canal

In 1801, Ernst Conrad returned to Bydgoszcz to work as a building inspector. His duties included supervising constructions in cities, in the Netze District forest offices and monitoring works on the Bydgoszcz Canal.

At the end of 1803, he was appointed inspector of water construction and Bydgoszcz Canal inspector, in replacement of his half-brother Johann, who moved to Gdańsk to work on the harbour construction.

Most of the activity Ernst Conrad Peterson in Bydgoszcz was related to construction works on the canal, particularly during the period 1801–1805. Indeed, since the opening of the canal in 1774, the Prussian authorities never allocated enough funds for its maintenance, leading to the incapacity of the facility in 1792 to ferry grain from the Vistula river westwards.

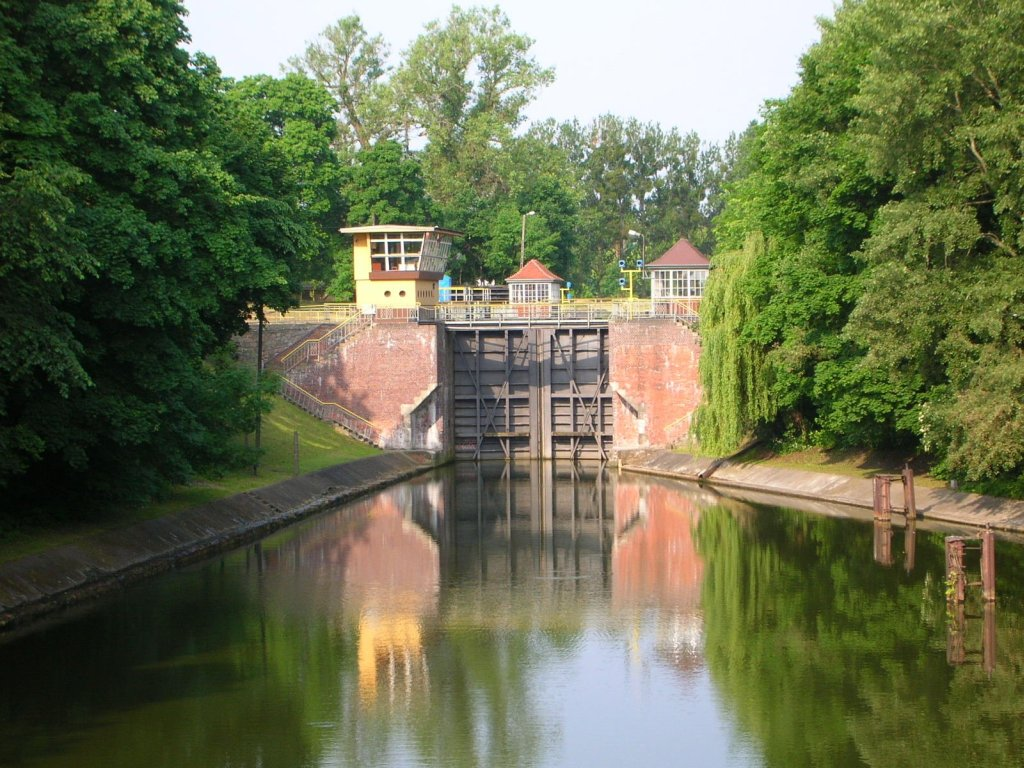
Water lock at Czyżkówko

During the tenure under Prussian rule (till 1806), Ernst carried out a steady construction work:

- clearing the canal from deposited sand and vegetation;
- strengthening the banks;
- converting most of the wooden locks into brick and stone devices;
- erecting 3 new weirs;
- building a new water lock in Nakło nad Notecią in the western end part of the canal.

In the eastern side within Bydgoszcz territory and its suburbs, he had trees planted along the banks of the channel. The area is today one of the largest city park and entertainment areas in Bydgoszcz.

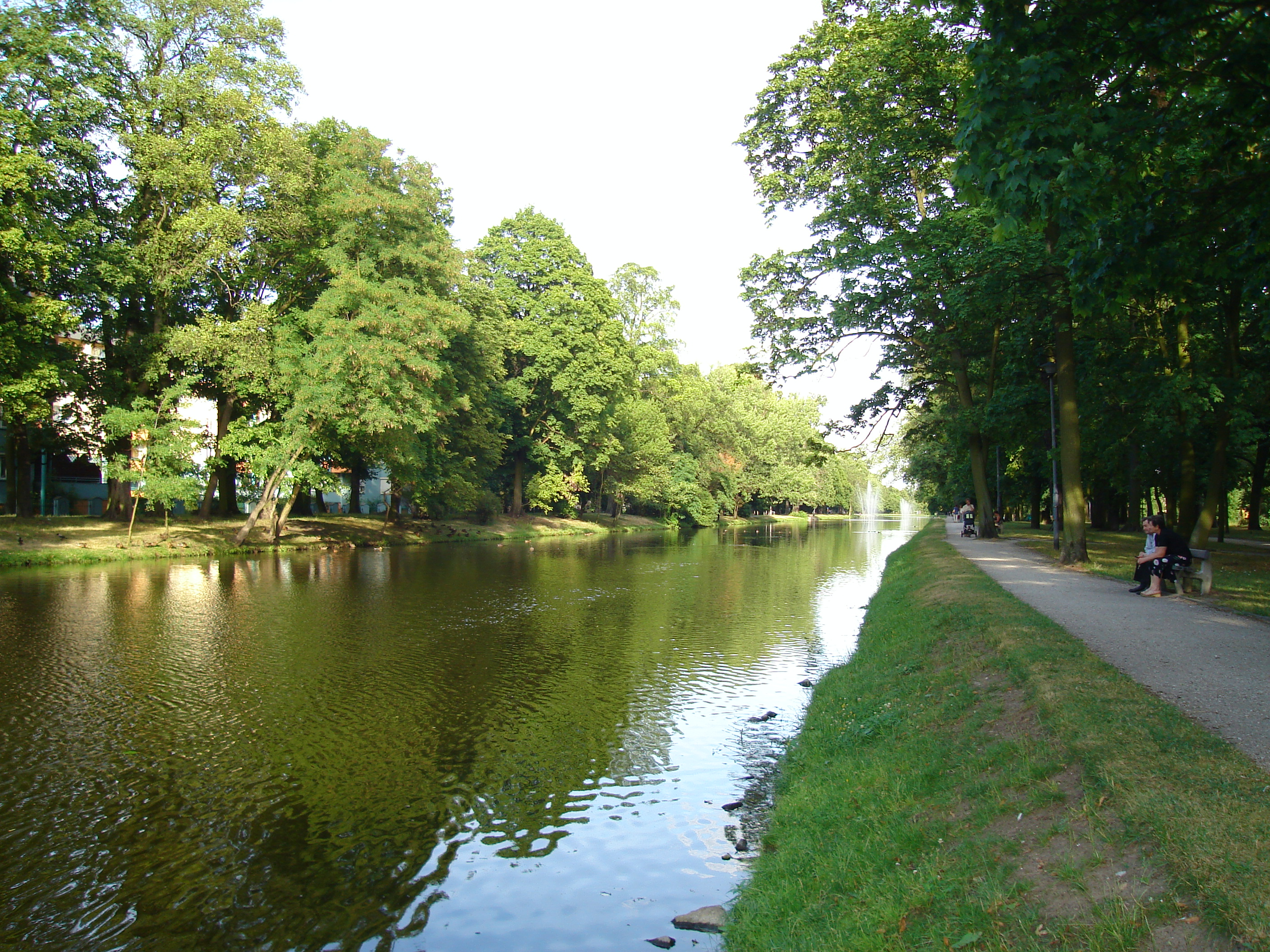
Park canal today

Under the Napoleonic Duchy of Warsaw (1807–1815), Ernst Conrad, as Bydgoszcz canal inspector, was subordinated to the Bydgoszcz Department prefect Antoni Gliszczyński. At that time, he built a sluice in Bielawy and a weir in Dębinek. He also undertook the reconstruction and extension of the Górnonotecki Canal.

In 1815, while Bydgoszcz returned to Prussian control, Ernst was part of the city's delegation which rendered homage to the visiting Frederick William III of Prussia.

=== Entrepreneurship ===
In 1815, Ernst Conrad Peterson left the civil service and took up running his own business.

Eventually, he was the owner of three brickyards:

- one located near the city lock, built in 1792, initially intended to provide bricks to the canal worksite;
- one in Żupy, (at today's 45 Toruńska Street), set up in 1803;
- one in Okole, near present-day Nadrzeczna Street, along the Brda river, built in 1808 to supply for railway bridge constructions in the city.

During the same period of time, Ernst Conrad set up two watermills on his estate of Czyżkówko:

- a lower mill to grind grain, located at today's 4 Młyńska street;
- an upper mill producing paper, which ceased operating in 1860.

He also owned a brewery and distillery. Finally, he invested into housing, commissioning tenements in Gdańska and Grunwaldzka streets.

His well-off situation allowed him to offer services to the city authorities. Hence on October 28, 1815, he was elected to the unpaid position of building advisor. In the municipal board, Ernst was responsible for monitoring constructions in the perspective of policy and building regulations.

=== Private life and activities ===
In 1836, he was awarded the Prussian Order of the Red Eagle.

Ernst Conrad was married to Dorotha Elisabeth née Senff. The couple had several children, among whom Friedrich Wilhelm Alex Franz and Ernst Emil, Mayor of Bydgoszcz from 1840 to 1844. He was involved in charity business, funding in 1817, the erection of a school and an orphanage in Czyżkówko. He also supported the teachers and carers working there.

From 1900 to 1945, a street in downtown Bydgoszcz was named after Peterson family ("Ulica Petersona" / "Peterson straße"): it is today Obrońców Bydgoszczy street. Ernst Conrad Peterson died on November 13, 1841, in Bydgoszcz.

== Ernst Emil Peterson (1808–1867) ==
Ernst Emil Peterson was born on December 18, 1808, in Bromberg. He was the son of Ernst Conrad and Dorotha Elisabeth née Senff.

After completing his law studies, he entered a judicial career. In 1837, he was appointed assessor of the higher national court, which allowed him to work in the city courts of then Bromberg.

With the death of the incumbent city Mayor Carl Boethke in 1840, Ernst Emil submitted his candidacy for the new election. He was elected for a 12-year mandate among 15 other candidates, on April 8, 1840. He took his position as Mayor on September 18, after the election was approved by the Royal regional assembly. This success was due in part to his father, Ernst Conrad, who was widely respected.

While presiding the city, Ernst Emil was also elected in 1843 a deputy to the Sejm of the Grand Duchy of Posen. There, he participated in the work of the parliamentary commission dealing with establishing a petition to the Prussian authorities about the restoration of Poles national rights. This petition had been triggered in reaction to the policy of Germanisation in the Grand Duchy of Posen, championed by Edward von Flottwell, the president of the province.

Emil's activities at the Posen Sejm costed him his seat of Mayor, as the Bromberg Royal assembly disapproved of his pro-Polish positions. An atmosphere of criticism grew over time in his entourage and turned into an open political conflict between the city authorities and the state administration, making it the functioning of the city services impossible. Eventually, Ernst Emil Peterson had to resign on March 28, 1844. He indeed left his position on April 3, shortening by far his 12-year term.

After his departure, he returned to work at the city courts. From 1844 to 1847, he was a defense attorney at the District Court in Bromberg. In 1847, he was appointed as a notary, a professional activity he kept until his death.

In 1848, he received the title of commissioner of justice as a defense attorney at the National Court in Bromberg. Subsequently, he was elevated to the rank of lawyer and in 1864, he was awarded the title of counselor of justice.

Ernst Emil Peterson died on November 13, 1867, in Bromberg.

He was married to Elise née Bischoff, they had five children, and lived in the family abode at 39 Toruńska street. Julius, one of their sons, became Mayor of Bromberg from 1881 to 1889.

== Ernst Heinrich Peterson (1843–1905) ==
Ernst Heinrich was born on July 30, 1843, in Grudziądz. His father Friedrich Wilhelm Alex Franz, a superintendent of the city stewardship, was the son of Ernst Conrad Peterson. His mother was Adelheid Louise Charlotte née Bischoff.

In 1843, he moved with his parents to Bydgoszcz. In 1869, he assumed the management of his uncle William's estate and business inherited from his grandfather Ernst Conrad, comprising three brickyards (in Bromberg/Bydgoszcz, Żupy and Okole) and a watermill in Czyżkówko.

=== Entrepreneurship ===
Ernst Heinrich Peterson was a talented entrepreneur who efficiently developed the family business. In 1871, he modernized the Okole brickyard by installing a ring kiln which provided a continuous fire in the brick production. At the same time, he closed the other brickyards at the city lock and in Żupy, moving the clay stocks by special ferries on the Brda river to Okole.

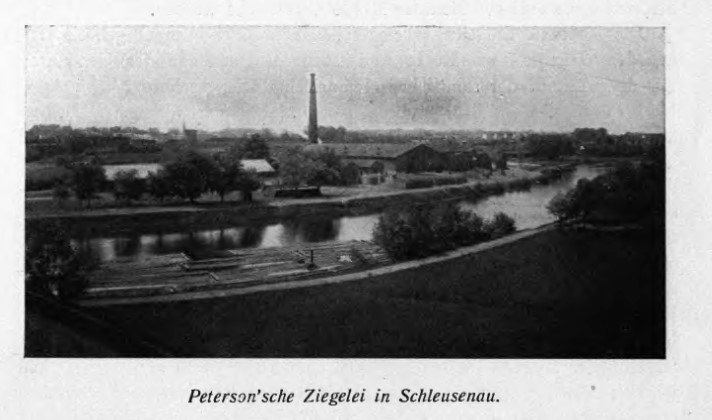
Peterson Brickyard ca 1907

Following his father's footsteps, Ernst Heinrich participated in industrial exhibitions. He was a member of the organizing committee of the provincial industrial exhibition in Bromberg (German: Provinzial-Gewerbeausstellung)), which took place from May 15, to August 15, 1880. There, he exhibited his firm products, from the ordinary masonry bricks to roof tiles and hollow bricks, to brick drainage pipes which were a novelty at that time. The 1880 exhibition was the largest in the history of that time in Bromberg/Bydgoszcz and one of the largest in the province of Posen/Poznań.

His company was constantly growing, taking advantage both of the convenient location on the Brda river and of the factory secondary track connecting the plant with the regular railway network. At the beginning of the 20th century, Peterson's brickyard employed between 80 and 100 workers. Its annual production almost reached 5 million bricks of all types (e.g. hollow bricks, clinker bricks, face bricks and hand-made bricks used to build churches).

=== Julius Otto Franz ===
Julius Otto Franz, Ernst Heinrich's son, inherited his father's business, i.e. the Okole refurbished brickyard and the old water mills in Czyżkówko. In 1860, Franz dismantled the paper mill and in 1901, the remaining watermill burns down completely.

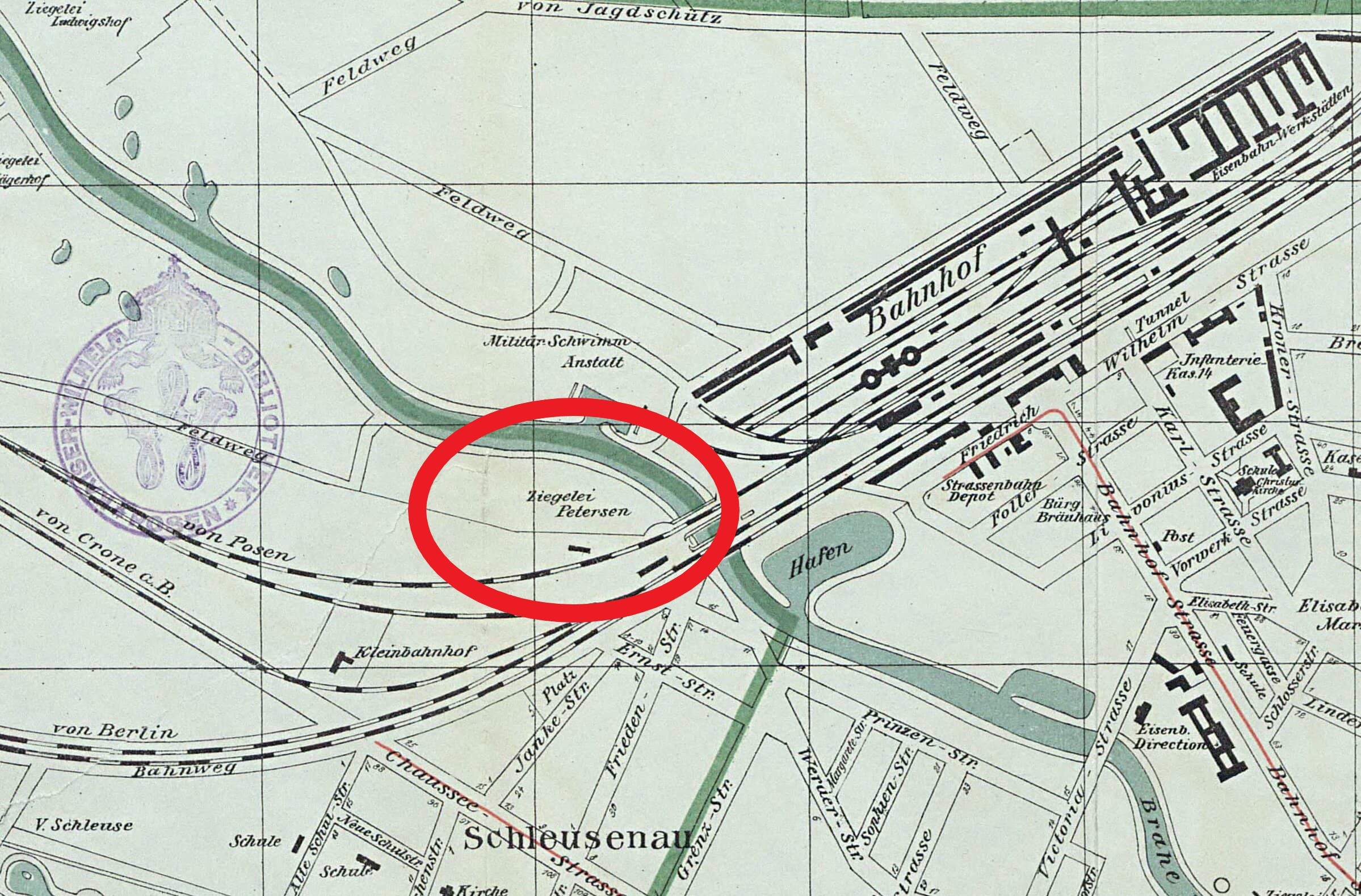
Peterson brickyard on a map ca 1905

Franz Peterson rebuilt a modernized grain processing mill, fitted with a 51.5 kilowatts (69.1 hp) motor engine, a 25.8 kilowatts (34.6 hp) water turbine fed by a nearby 118 square feet (11.0 m^{2}) pond. The mill daily produced 14 tons of grain. The facility operated till May 1951, when the State Grain department (Polish: Państwowe Zakłady Zbożowe) handed it to the local Peasant Cooperative in Bydgoszcz.

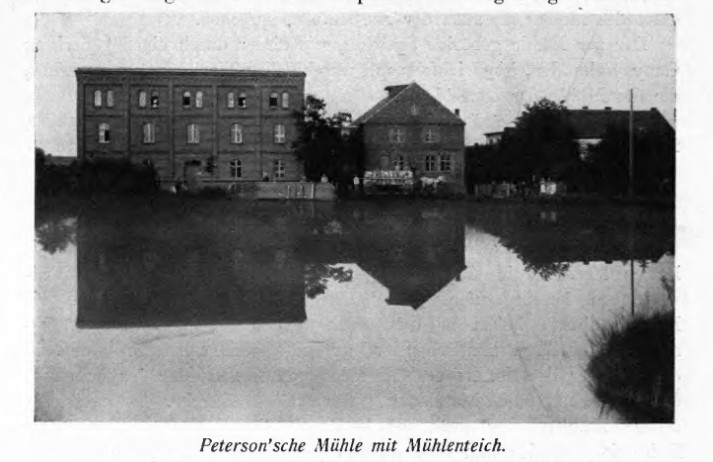
Peterson mill and pond 1907

In 2007, the surviving mill was demolished and a residential estate "Młyn" was built on its foundations. The shape, elevation and function of the new edifice still reflect the historic building. The water stream flows through the building, driving a mill wheel, which generates electricity for the complex.

=== Social and charity activities ===
Around 1890, Ernst Heinrich founded a first house estate for workers in Bromberg on his property of Czyżkówko. Eventually, 24 houses were built; each had 3 living rooms, a kitchen and a corridor and were inhabited by brickyard workers, craftsmen and railway workers. Each plot was 2 acres (8,100 m^{2}) to 4 acres (16,000 m^{2}) large, with a pigsty, a cowshed and a small barn. Furthermore, he created a bathhouse and a swimming pool next to it, as brick workers did not have a sewage system, in the intent to raise their standard of living.

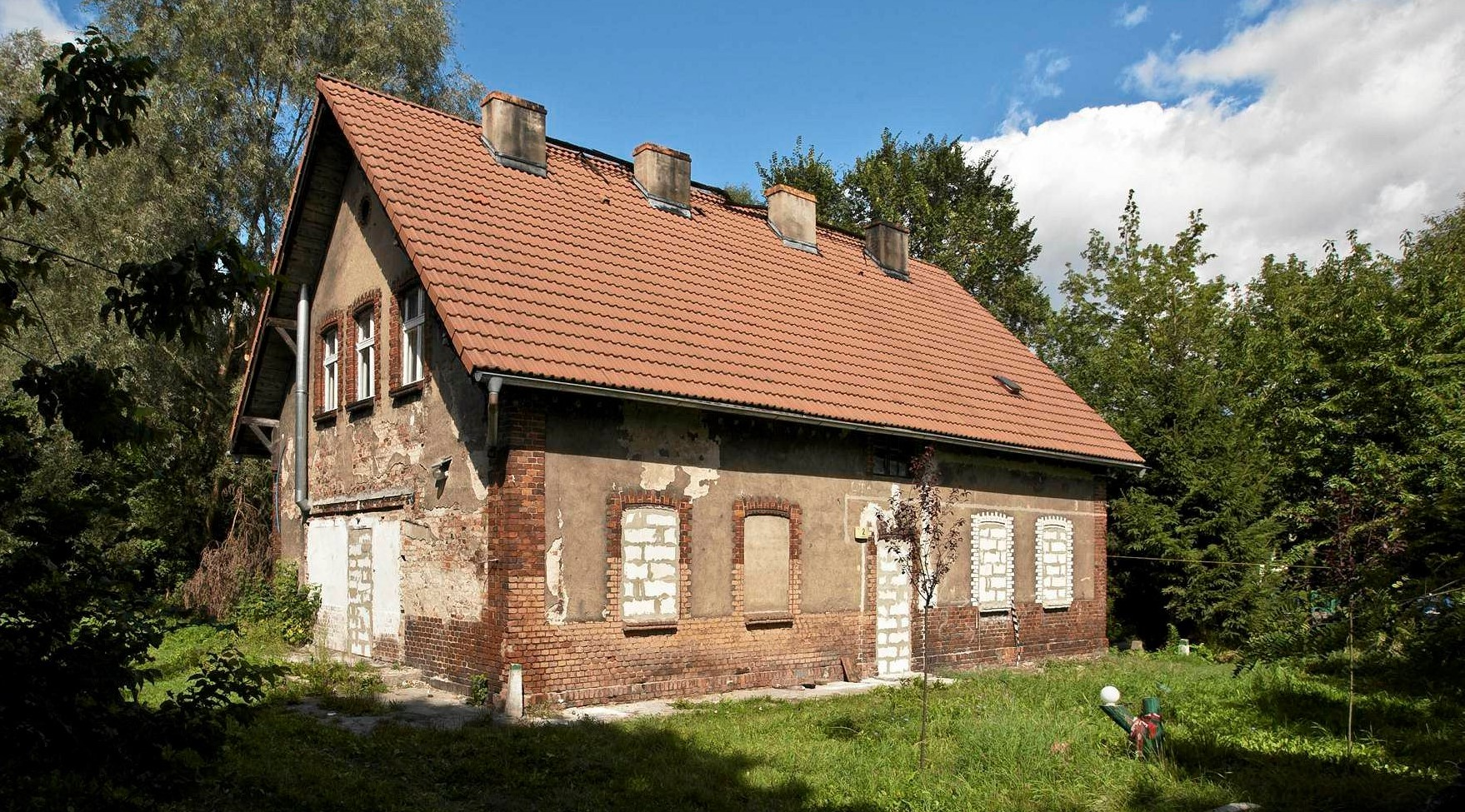
Peterson Bathing director property, in 2023

He also financially supported the local organization Vaterländischer Frauenverein (Patriotic Women's Association) which wad been operating in Okole since 1898. Its longtime president was his wife and the association aimed at running a kindergarten managed by deacons.

Ernst Heinrich was also a member of the Verschönerungs – Verein zu Bromberg (Embellishment Association in Bromberg) and the Historische Gesellschaft für den Netzedistrikt zu Bromberg (Historical Society of the Nadnotecki District in Bromberg). In one of their publications, he released in 1899 excerpts from the diary kept by his grandfather, engineer on the Bydgoszcz Canal.

He married in 1876 Johanna Maria Helena née von Grabowska. The couple had 3 sons and a daughter. Ernst Heinrich Peterson died on February 21, 1905, in Okole, then a suburban commune of Bydgoszcz/Bromberg.

In 2012, his name was given to one of the streets of the Bydgoszcz Industrial and Technological Park.

== Julius Peterson (1852–1935) ==
Julius Peterson was born on December 19, 1852, in Bydgoszcz/Bromberg. He was the son of Ernst Emil Peterson and Elise née Bischoff.

As such, Julius came from a well-known family, settled in the town since the end of the 18th century, which had a certain clout in the city, thanks to his ancestors: Ernst Conrad Peterson, his grandfather and Ernst Emil Peterson.

Upon graduating from the municipal school, Julius continued his education at the Fryderyk Wilhelm Gymnasium in Bydgoszcz, where he passed his secondary school-level examination in 1871 . After having studied law, he returned to Bydgoszcz in 1878 to work as a referendary at the court of appeal.

In 1881, he was elected deputy Mayor (German: burger-meister) of Bydgoszcz and assumed his duties on October 6. At that time, the Mayor was Julius Bachmann, also head of the administration. During their tenure, Bydgoszcz/Bromberg experienced an intensive economic development:

- small craft workshops became significant industrial plants (e.g. "LEO" shoe factory, Ludwig Buchholz's Tannery, Hermann Löhnert Maschinenfabrik);
- construction was booming;
- several school buildings were erected;
- Bydgoszcz/Bromberg connected to three regional railway networks leading to Chełmża, Żnin and Koronowo.

Julius also organized the city's welfare activities: as such, he chaired the city's directorate office for the poor and the orphans.

During his tenure, the city authorities decided to name one of the streets in downtown district after Petersons', to commemorate the family's merits for the development of the city.

On September 30, 1889, Julius resigned as Burmistrz, probably as a result of a raising conflict between the Mayor's office and the City Council.

Despite his family's long lasting ties with Bydgoszcz/Bromberg, he settled in Wrocław. There, he was elected a councilor of the city magistrate.

In 1887, Julius married to Mathilde Clara Augusta Bollmann. Their daughter, Gertrude Auguste Elise, was born in 1888 in Bydgoszcz. Julius Peterson died on November 9, 1935, in Wrocław.

== Fragmentary family tree ==
- Martin Fryderyk
  - Johann Gotfried Conrad married Dorotha Elizabeth Mursinna
    - Johann Philip, from first marriage with Anna Gertrud Mursinna (?-1763)
    - Ernst Conrad Peterson (1778–1841) married Dorotha Elizabeth Senff
      - William
      - Ernst Emil Peterson (1808–1867) married Elise Bischoff
        - 4 children
          - Franz (?-1905)
        - Julius Peterson (1852–1935) married Mathilde Clara Augusta Bollmann
          - Gertrude Auguste Elise (1888–?)
      - Friedrich Wilhelm Alex Franz Peterson married Adelheid Louise Charlotte Bischoff
        - Ernst Heinrich Peterson (1843–1905) married Johanna Maria Helena von Grabowska
          - 4 children
          - Julius Otto Franz Peterson

== See also ==
- Bydgoszcz
- Bydgoszcz Canal
- David Gilly
- List of city mayors of Bydgoszcz

== Bibliography ==
- Błażejewski, Stanisław; Kutta, Janusz; Romaniuk, Marek (1995). Bydgoski Słownik Biograficzny. Tom II [Bydgoszcz Biographical Dictionary. Volume II] (in Polish). Bydgoszcz: Kujawsko-Pomorskie Towarzystwo Kulturalne. pp. 114–118. ISBN 83-85327-27-4.
- Błażejewski, Stanisław; Kutta, Janusz; Romaniuk, Marek (1998). Bydgoski Słownik Biograficzny. Tom V [Bydgoszcz Biographical Dictionary. Volume V] (in Polish). Bydgoszcz: Kujawsko-Pomorskie Towarzystwo Kulturalne. pp. 83–86.
