= Bydgoszcz Canal =

Waterway between Bydgoszcz and Nakło in Poland

Coordinates: 53.139435°N 17.764793°E

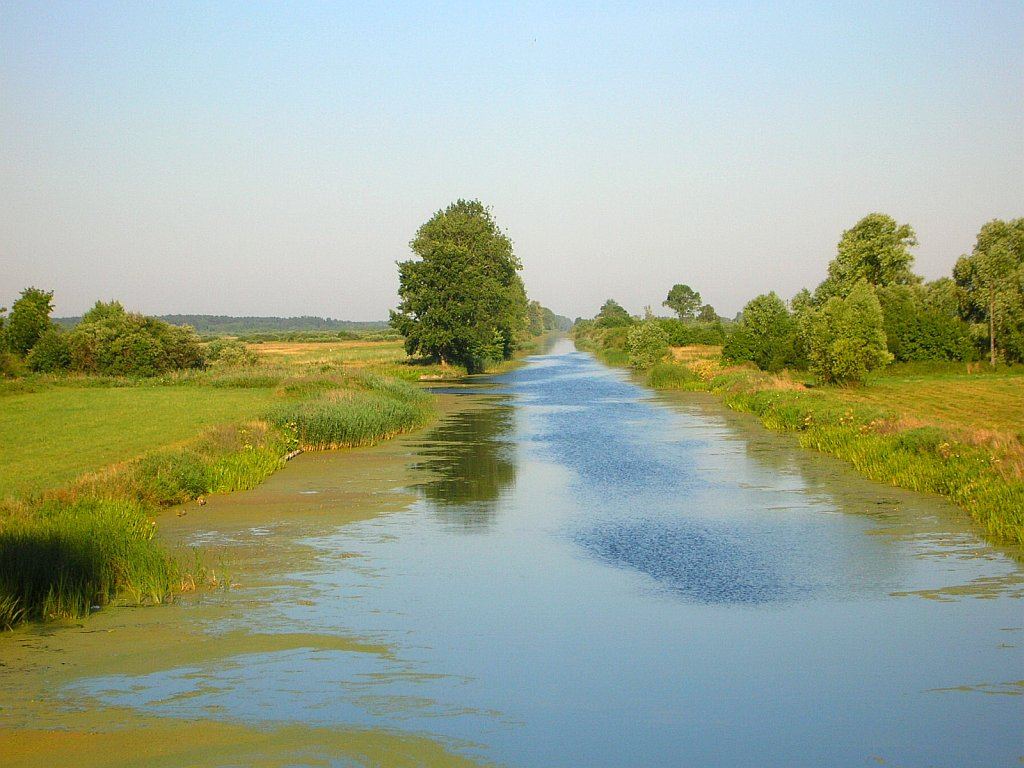
- The canal near Kruszyn, Bydgoszcz County
- Interactive map of Bydgoszcz Canal

Specifications
- Length: 24.77 km (15.39 miles)
- Maximum boat length: 57 m (187 ft 0 in)
- Maximum boat beam: 9.5 m (31 ft 2 in)
- Locks: 6

History
- Modern name: Polish: Kanał Bydgoski
- Principal engineer: Franz von Brenkenhoff
- Construction began: 1773
- Date of first use: 14 June 1774
- Date completed: 1775
- Date extended: 1904

Geography
- Start point: Bydgoszcz, Poland
- End point: Nakło nad Notecią, Poland
- Branch: Old Bydgoszcz Canal
- Branch of: European Waterway E70; Vistula-Oder Waterway
- Connects to: Warta river

Bydgoszcz Canal (Polish: Kanał Bydgoski, German: Bromberger Kanal) is a canal between the cities of Bydgoszcz and Nakło nad Notecią in Poland. It is 24.7 km long and connects the Vistula river with the Oder river, through the Brda and Noteć rivers (the latter ending in the Warta river which itself ends in the Oder). The level difference along the canal is regulated by 6 locks. The canal was built in 1772–1775 on the order of King Frederick II of Prussia after the First Partition of Poland.

The Bydgoszcz Canal has been listed on the Kuyavian-Pomeranian Voivodeship Heritage List, Nr.A/900/1-27, on 30 November 2005.

== Location ==
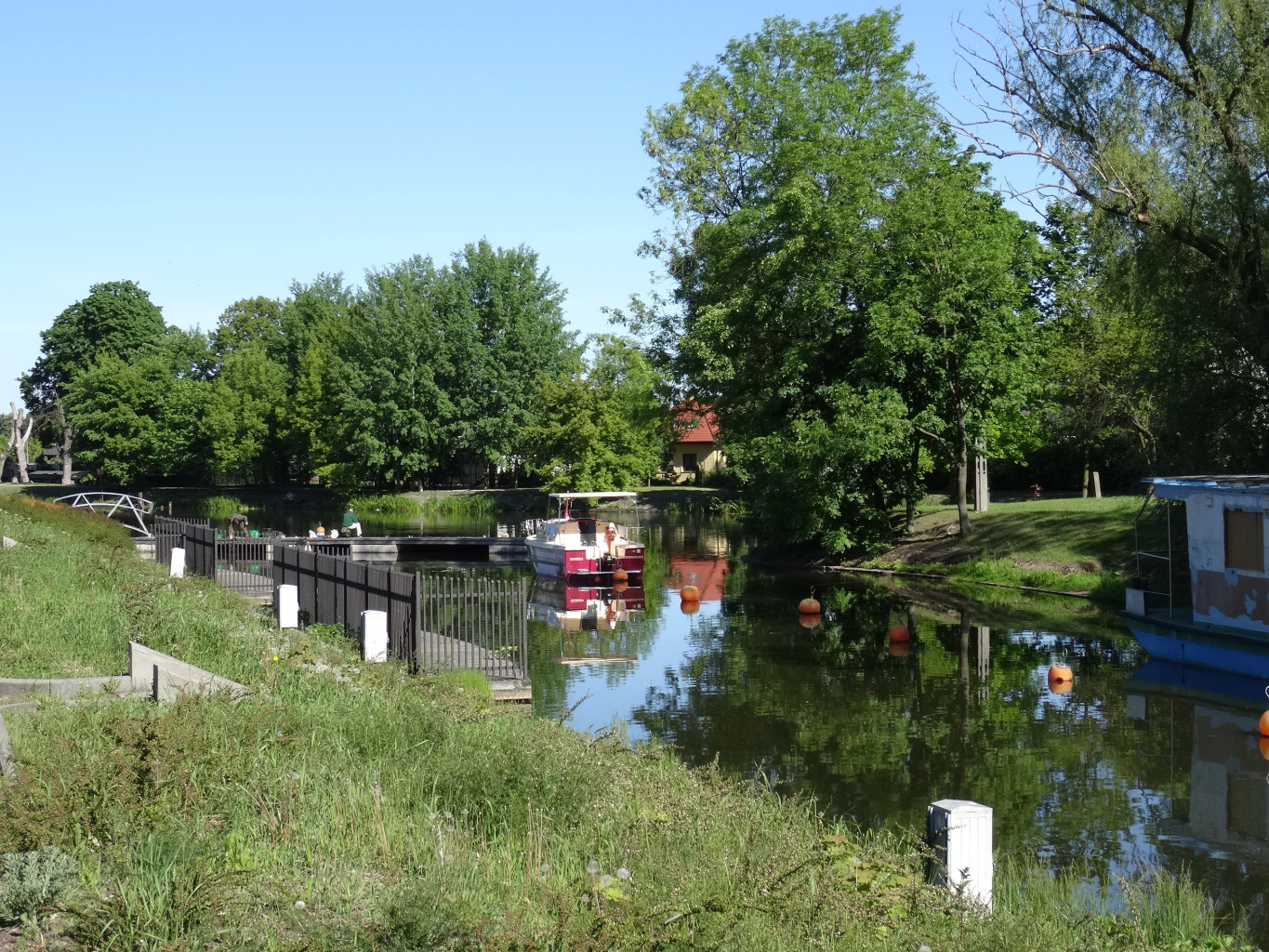
Portion of the canal downtown

The route of the Bydgoszcz Canal finds its way through an ancient valley about 2 km wide, surrounded by steep edges:

- on the north, the Krajeńskie Lake District banks are 25 to 40 m high;
- on the south the upper slopes of the Toruń basin are 10 to 15 m high.

The area was created about 12,000 years ago by a divide between the basins of Oder and Vistula rivers. The canal starts in downtown Bydgoszcz, flowing through the western part of the city, it then crosses Bydgoszcz district on 7 km and ends at Nakło nad Notecią.

The Bydgoszcz Canal is a key element of the Vistula-Oder Waterway (294.3 km long), which in turn is part of the international Waterway E70, connecting Antwerp (Belgium) and the Atlantic Ocean to Klaipėda (Lithuania) and the Baltic Sea. Its main intended role comes as being a component of this east–west navigable shipping route.

The Vistula–Oder Waterway passes through the Brda River, a tributary of the Vistula, and connects to the Bydgoszcz Canal, which contains two water locks located within the city.

Beyond Bydgoszcz, the waterway continues through the canal to Nakło nad Notecią, passing through 14 water locks. At Nakło nad Notecią, it follows the Noteć and Warta rivers before ultimately joining the Oder River. Several large harbors and berths are available en route: Bydgoszcz, Nakło nad Notecią, Ujście, Czarnków, Krzyż Wielkopolski, Gorzów Wielkopolski and Santok.

== History ==
=== First projects ===
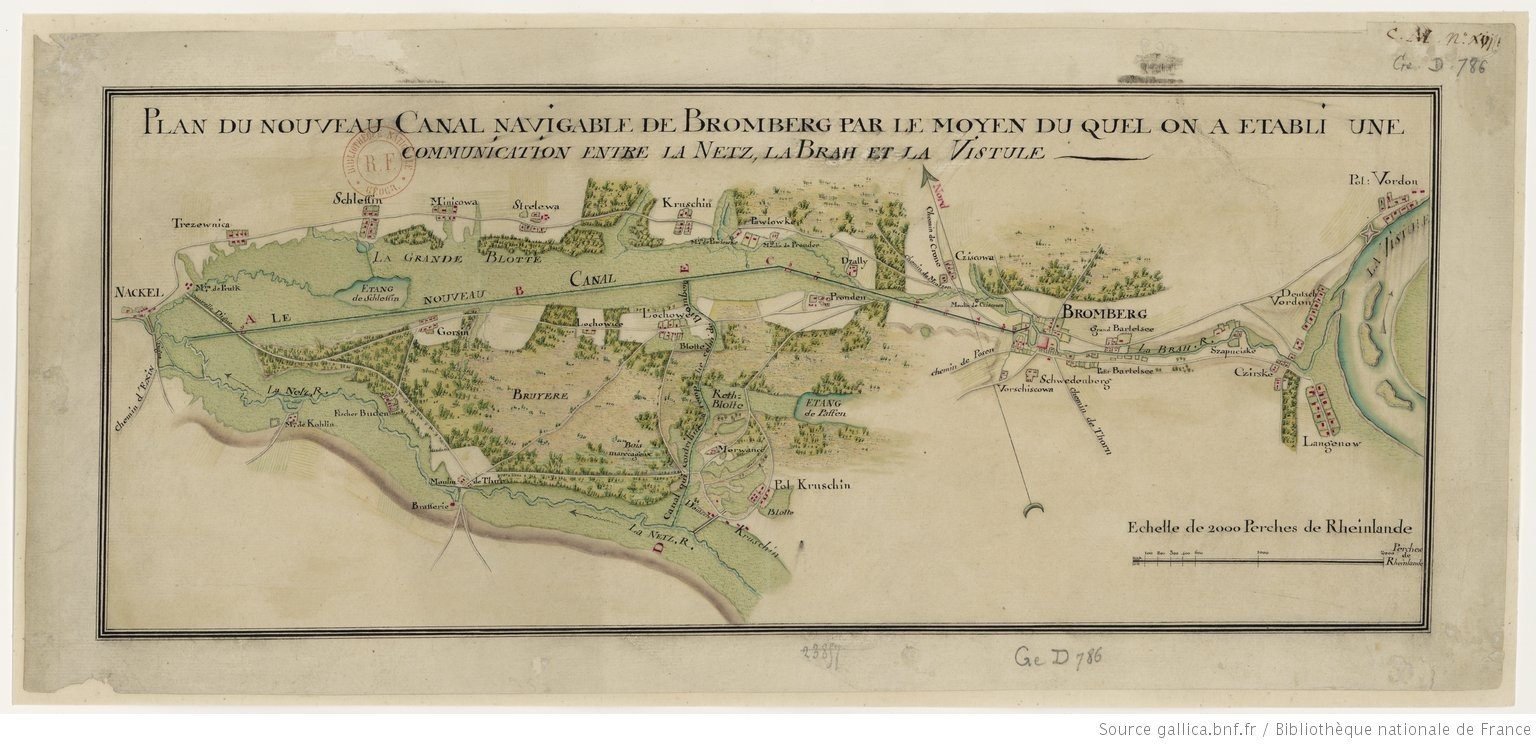
1788 map of the canal

Assumptively, navigation between Brda and Noteć rivers has taken place in a very distant past, considering archeological foundings:

- in 1827, an anchor was found where stands today Grunwaldzka Street;
- in 1840, a large remains of a ship and a docking installation were unearthed near the village of Łochowo.

The Vistula and Oder rivers were only 11 kilometres (6.8 mi) apart, considering the situation of their tributaries (Noteć and Brda rivers): the junction of both hydrographic basins seemed unavoidable. First plans were established as soon as technical and political opportunities appeared. Discussions to link the Noteć and the Brda first occurred in the 16th century during the Polish-Brandenburg talks and were renewed in the 1630s by king Władysław IV Vasa.

=== Polish project ===
In the 1750s, canal schemes were very popular: first realizations were already completed in France, England or Germany, while in Poland, Prince Michał Kazimierz Ogiński supported the construction of the Oginski Canal, and the Dnieper–Bug Canal was completed at the end of the 18th century. Nearby Bydgoszcz, works started east of Rynarzewo, run by Mr Małachowski, landlord in Łabiszyn: in the 1770s, trenches were excavated and usable as a portion of a navigable canal in the area.

One of the first major projects under consideration by King Stanisław August Poniatowski was a channel linking the Noteć with the Brda via Bydgoszcz. Main aims to be achieved were facilitating Polish goods exports to Western Europe, as well as commercial exploitation of forest resource (neglected so far), while weakening the quasi-monopoly of the then-Prussian city of Danzig. Politically, a consideration speaking against this concept was that such a canal could in fact increase the power of the Kingdom of Prussia.

On 9 July 1766, during a meeting of the Committee of the Crown Treasury, a plan was presented by artillery captain and royal geographer Franciszek Florian Czaki. He proposed to build the canal where the Noteć was the closest to Bydgoszcz. It was planned to be 10.5 kilometres (6.5 mi) long, 9 metres (30 ft) wide and 3.5 metres (11 ft) deep. The level difference (18 metres (59 ft)) between the Brda and the Noteć was compensated by six water locks. Construction would have been carried out by a private company, which would then have received the right to collect taxes in return. Approval for building this project was not given by the Sejm, due to the political turmoils of the time (1768): Bar Confederation, then First Partition of Poland. In retrospect, the project was not devoid of technical defects, especially in under-estimating the requirement of water resources that could be found locally (streams and wetlands).

=== Completion of the Prussian project ===
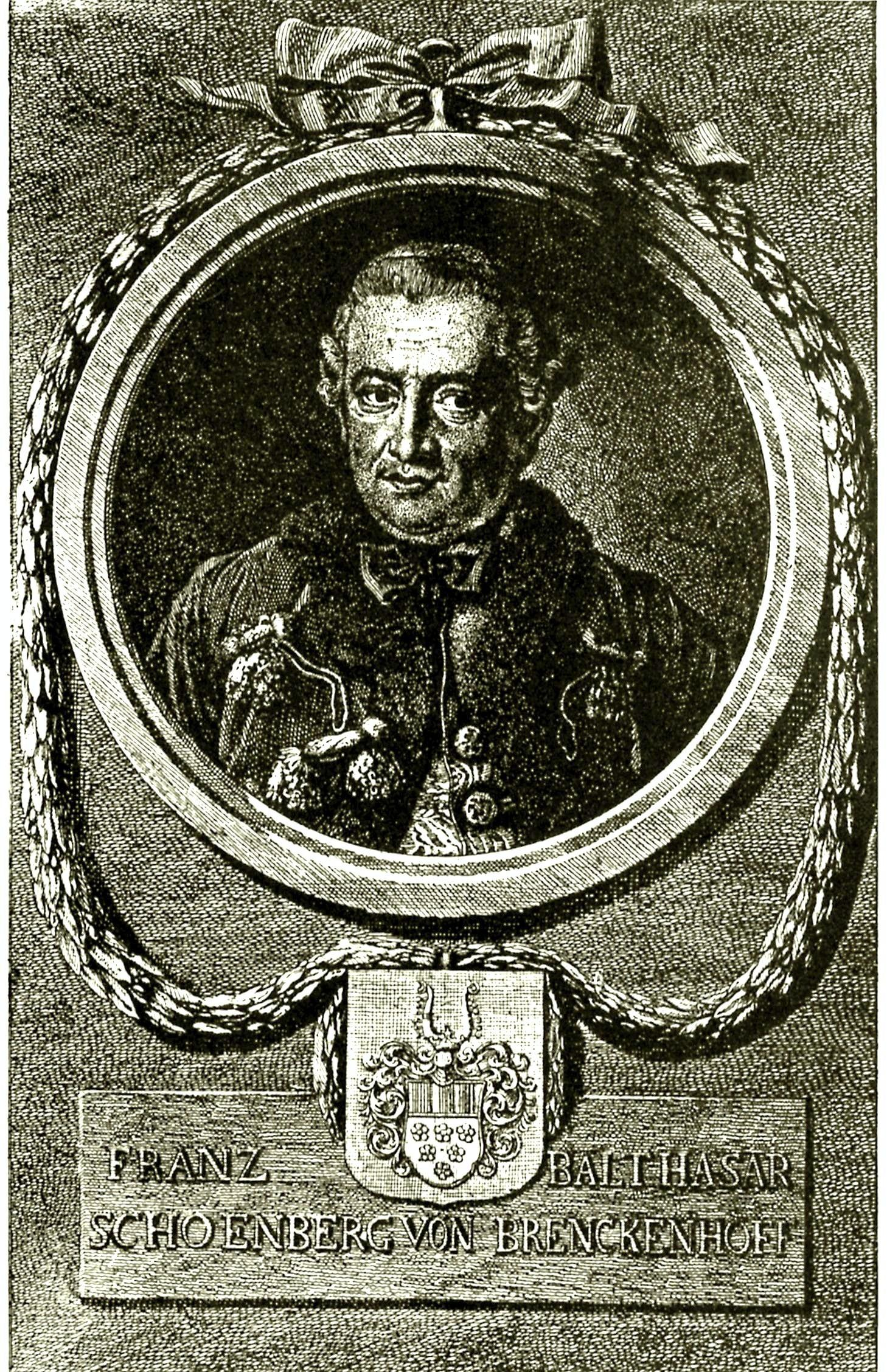
Franz Balthasar Schoenberg von Brenkenhoff

The Prussian project was born after the first partition of Poland. Lands where the Vistula, Brda and Noteć flowed were all under the control of the Kingdom of Prussia and Frederick the Great took specific interest in this situation. The Prussian project was worked out by several personalities: Frederick the Great, of course, but also politician Franz von Brenkenhoff, engineer Hermann Jawein or Minister of Foreign Affairs Ewald Friedrich Hertzberg. Presumably, during his journey through the lands occupied by Prussia, Hermann Jawein was the first to identify the potential of the local hydrographic system, in particular meadow resources, which could be obtained after draining the Bydgoszcz canal valley. In February 1772, this idea was brought to the attention of governor Franz von Brenkenhoff, who, once having investigated the situation on the spot, went to talk king of Prussia Frederick II into approving the project. Many benefits were expected from the completion of the canal:

- creating an alternate trading pole (after Danzig);
- improving transport and communication within the newly expanded Province of Brandenburg;
- revitalizing the central Noteć valley;
- colonizing the Brda and Noteć rivers.

The canal design was shaped in spring of 1772. It hinged on a classic solution: the draining and re-routing of the ancient urstromtal. Initially, plans comprised the use of water supplies from:

- Ślesińskiego Lake (now Stawy Kardynalskie in Ślesin) near Nakło;
- streams flowing from the Lake District north of Bydgoszcz;
- drainage of swamps.

Further researches showed, however, that the amount of water would still be neither sufficient nor regular. Hence the decision to use most elevated water flows from the Noteć river, which required the construction of a specific ditch from Rynarzewo to Lisi Ogon. The required support of Noteć waters caused the canal location to be located more to the south than originally planned.

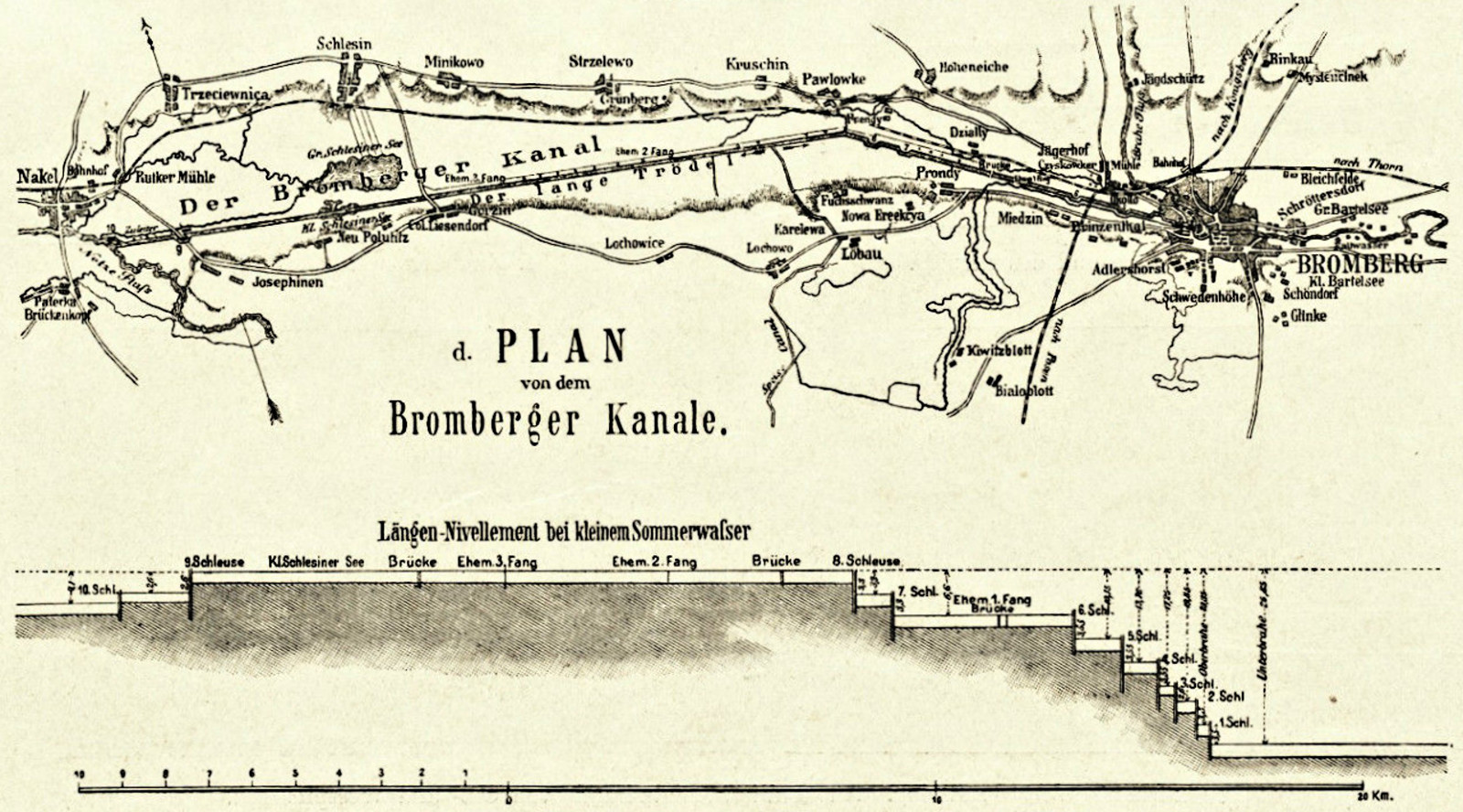
1894 - Cross section of the canal

The work began in spring 1773, with a man power of 8,000 workers coming from Mecklenburg, Thuringia, Saxony, Dessau and Czechia. After one year, all the water locks were completed. The canal official opening took place on 14 June 1774, but works continued until 1775. 2000 workers died from dysentery and fever, the rest was ordered to settle in three colonies on Osowa Góra premises.

The new waterway was 26.7 kilometres (16.6 mi) long, with 10 wooden locks: 9 in Bydgoszcz and one in Nakło nad Notecią. At the same time as the completion of the Bydgoszcz Canal, the water supply channel (Górnonotecki Canal) was achieved: 25 kilometres (16 mi) long, it brought Noteć water (picked up near Rynarzewo) to the canal (near the location of the village Łochowo). It was now possible to ferry goods through inland waterway from Vistula, Bug, San and Narew rivers to Szczecin, thus bypassing Baltic Sea.

Apart from the short Kanał Jagielloński (1483), the Bydgoszcz canal was then the oldest artificial waterway completed on Polish lands; at the time, it was called The miracle work of time. It was followed by other similar realizations: the Dnieper–Bug Canal (1784) or the Oginski Canal (1783).

=== First operational period (1774–1792) ===
The first period of use of the canal was difficult, since Prussia did not allocate funds to maintain equipment and construction (removing sand, vegetation or strengthening the banks). Between 1789 and 1792, a reconstruction of a Bydgoszcz lock (Śluza Miejska ) failed. Hampered by such technical difficulties, waterway traffic never increased dramatically: in the 1775, 1373 barges used the canal, but only 1319 in 1786. In 1792, after a failure to ferry grain from Vistula river to western Prussia, the authorities pushed on funding a modernization of the canal.

Since its inception, an insufficient amount of water has been a significant problem to operate the Canal. The highest section, between Osowa Góra and Józefinki, was particularly affected: the main reason was that the water supply channel (Górnonotecki Canal) did not provide the amount of water expected. In this situation, an extension of the Kanał Górnonotecki was performed (1793–1794), so as to reach Dębinek.

=== First renovation (1792–1806) ===
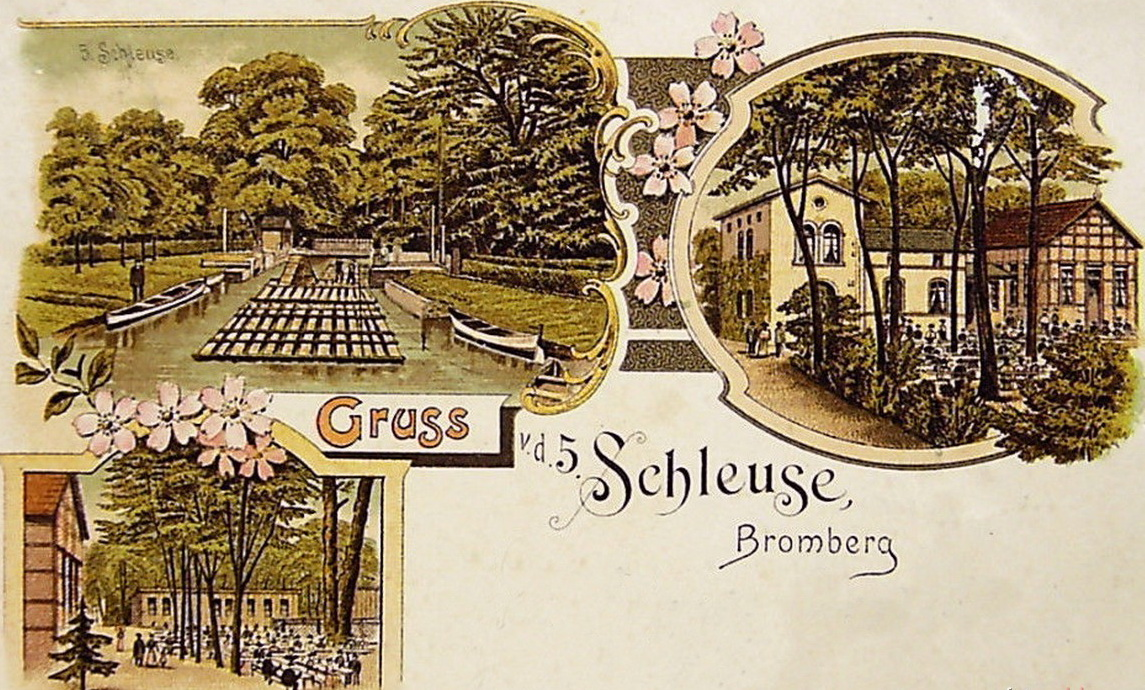
Postcard of the canal, 1898

The first reconstruction of the canal was performed by Ernst Conrad Peterson, a land drainage and later canal inspector. Between 1795 and 1801, he had 9 locks and 3 weirs rebuilt with brick material. The lock at Nakło East was the first renovated, leading to an extension of the canal by one kilometer, while one of the locks in Bydgoszcz was removed (between today's locks IV and V). All the rebuilt locks had the same dimensions: 49 metres (161 ft) by 6.6 metres (22 ft).

They were the first locks in Prussia constructed with bricks (previously sandstone was used). Ernst Conrad Peterson had trees planted on the banks of the canal (between locks I and VI), where today the Old Bydgoszcz canal natural park (Polish: Planty nad Kanałem Bydgoskim) is located, and brought settlers who were in charge of managing the banks of the Canal at Osowa Góra. In 1805, he also had the city lock (Śluza Miejska ) rebuilt with wood: the chamber was then 48.9 metres (160 ft) long and 6.6 metres (22 ft) deep. These structures are still preserved today, along the old canal section (locks IV Wroclawska, V Black Path and VI Bronikowski).

=== From 1806 to 1875 ===
Once Bydgoszcz incorporated to Polish territory (Duchy of Warsaw's period), repairs and maintenance of the canal kept on. In the area of Dębinek, a new weir was built so as to bring waters from Noteć river to the Górnonotecki Canal and a new lock in Nakło-West was constructed.

Works of Ernst Conrad Peterson were of such high quality, that for decades the canal carried on its operations without any additional extensive repair, except for the replacement of 15–20 years old wooden lock elements. From 1840 to 1852, two new massive granite-brick locks were built: Śluza Prądy and Osowa Góra lock. Both were locks of larger sizes, 51 metres (167 ft) by 5 metres (16 ft). Till 1861, three locks were removed, thanks to the canal bottoming out.

In 1841, a stone bridge over Bydgoszcz Canal was erected downtown: Władysław IV Vasa Bridge, which has been demolished in 1971 during Marshal Ferdinand Foch Street extension. Between 1858 and 1862, shipping traffic on the canal reached 4000 boats yearly.

=== Investments from 1875 to 1905 ===
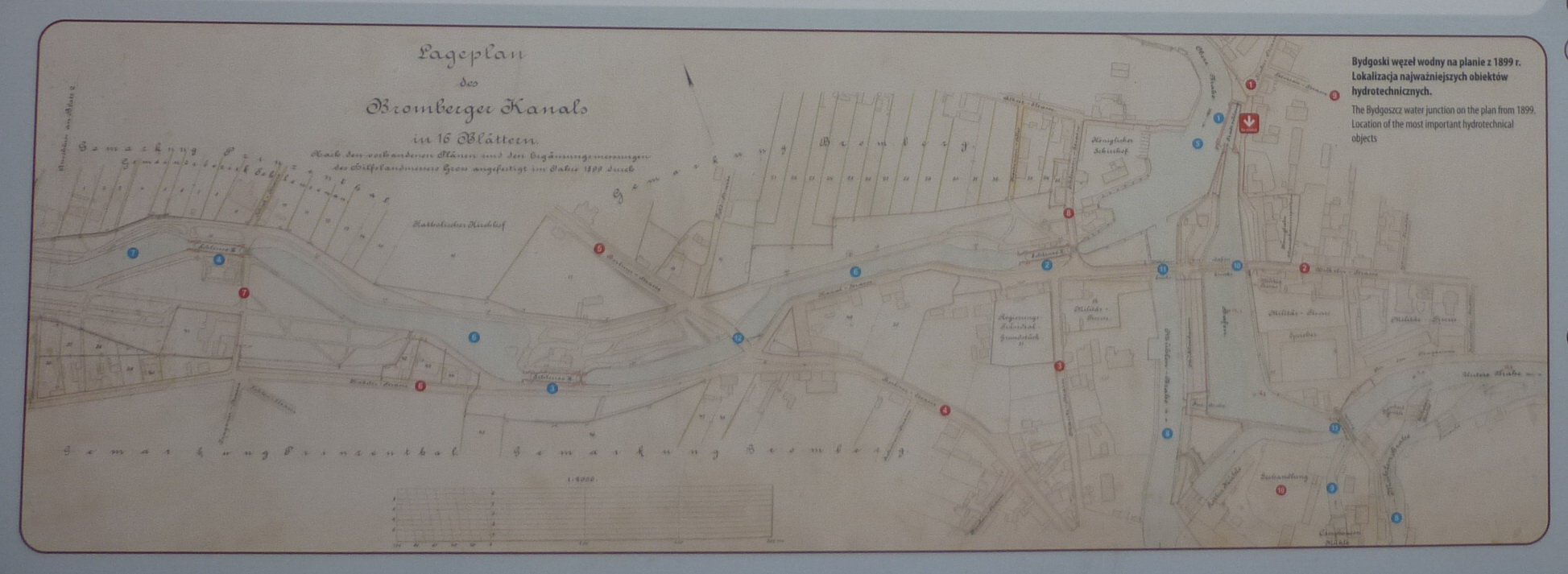
1899-Downtown lock network map

After 1870, Europe witnessed a significant acceleration of inland navigation: railways were still expensive, and transport of bulk cargo by water was still considered the most profitable means. This movement was multiplicated by the use of steam engines. On Bydgoszcz Canal, steam ships appeared after 1885: approximately 500 000 tons of cargo were transported each year.

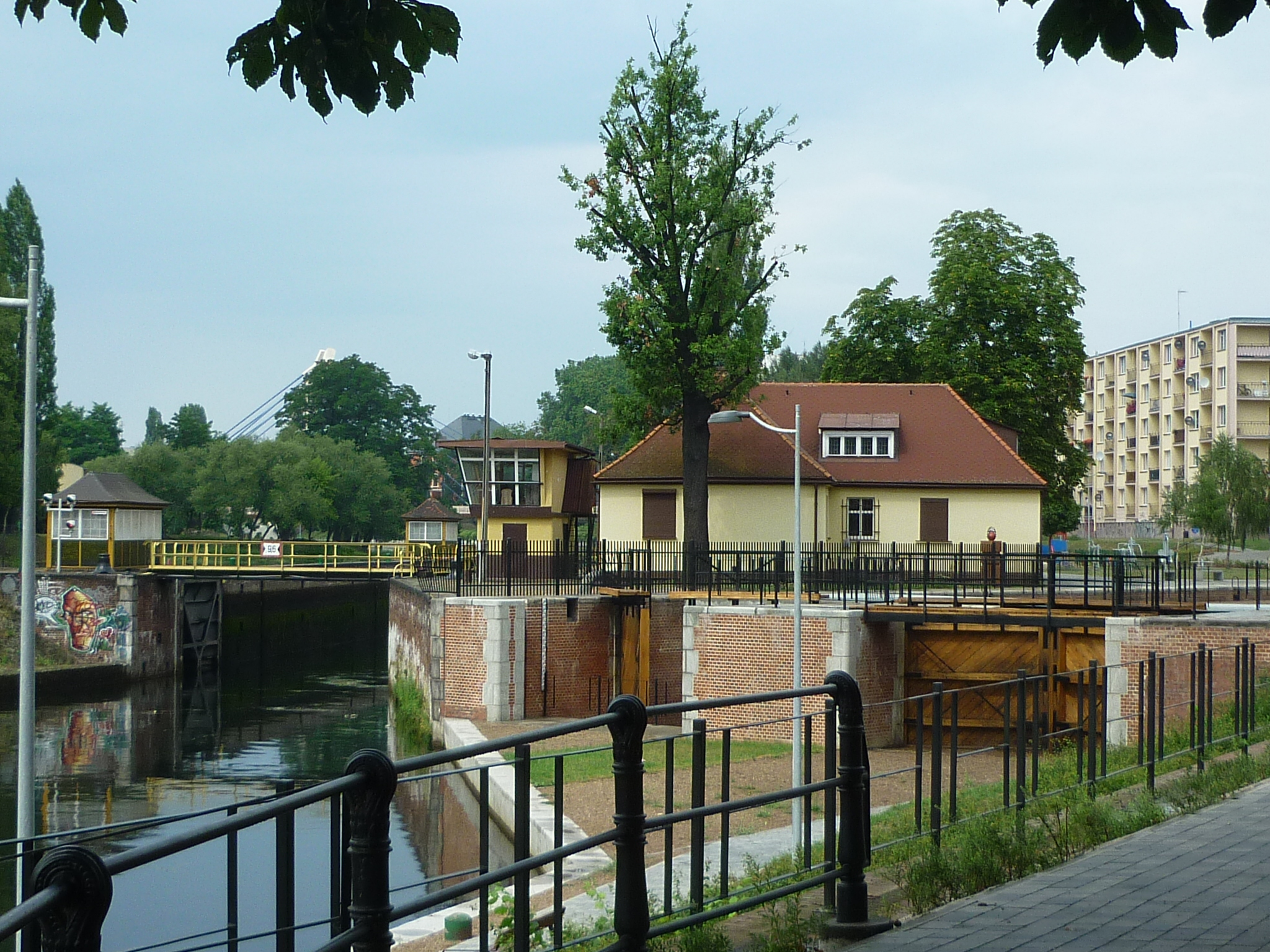
View of trapezoidal look of Śluza Miejska

Since the beginning of the operations on the canal, development of water transport had always been limited by a shortage of the volume of water. Improvement occurred in 1878–1882, after the realization of the upper canalization of Noteć at Gopło lake section, and the re-construction of parts of the Górnonotecki Canal.

In 1876, Brda river regulation started in Bydgoszcz, together with the construction of a 50-ha wood harbour in the area of Brdyujście district (today's Bydgoszcz rowing track). Two weirs and two locks were built at the time: Śluza Brdyujście and Śluza Kapuściska. With a significant increase of traffic on the canal, necessary works were performed, streamlining locks operations and saving canal's meagre water resources. In 1884, downtown lock (Śluza Miejska) was rebuilt, with its original trapezoidal shape and its unique operating process.

After a successful exploitation of the lower Brda river and the upper canal of Noteċ in fall of 1879, years between 1878 and 1882 witnessed large investments towards the Bydgoszcz Canal and the Vistula-Oder rivers waterway, which allowed:

- removing the last wooden lock (1889)
- rebuilding the lock at Nakło East (1887–1889);
- piercing a watercourse for the Brda river at Kapuściska district (1897);
- enlarging Bydgoszcz harbour (1903–1905) by removing a weir and a lock (Śluza Kapuściska) and by erecting a roller dam at Brdyujście.

=== Second renovation (1906–1915) ===
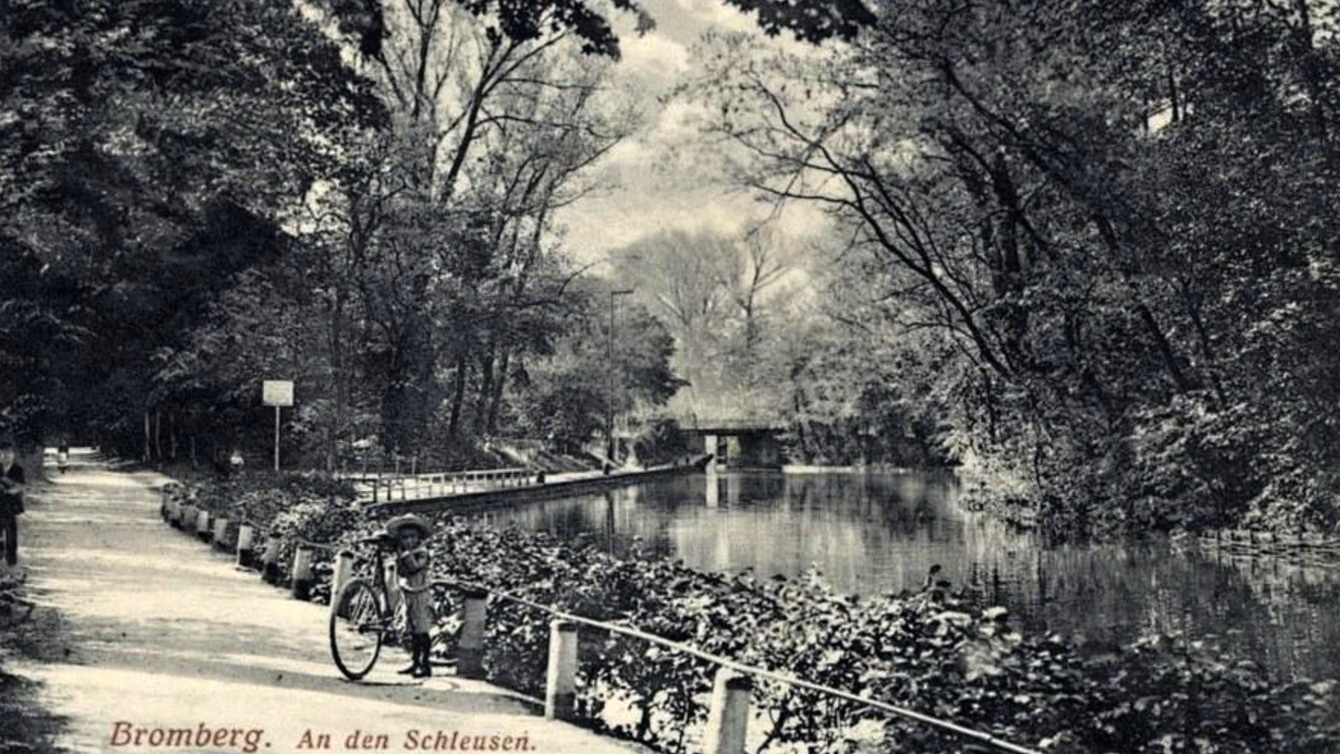
Bydgoszcz Canal, c. 1908

In 1904, Berlin approved an ambitious project available for large ships, called the Central Canal, aiming at linking Rhine and Vistula rivers through German Empire. An important part of this project comprised the reconstruction of the Vistula-Oder waterway -and the Bydgoszcz Canal- to allow barges up to 400 tons. On 1 April 1905 a special bill on waterways was passed, while at the same time rumors reported that the Russian Empire had planned to build a competitive waterway between Vistula and the Warta rivers. Studies started in 1906.

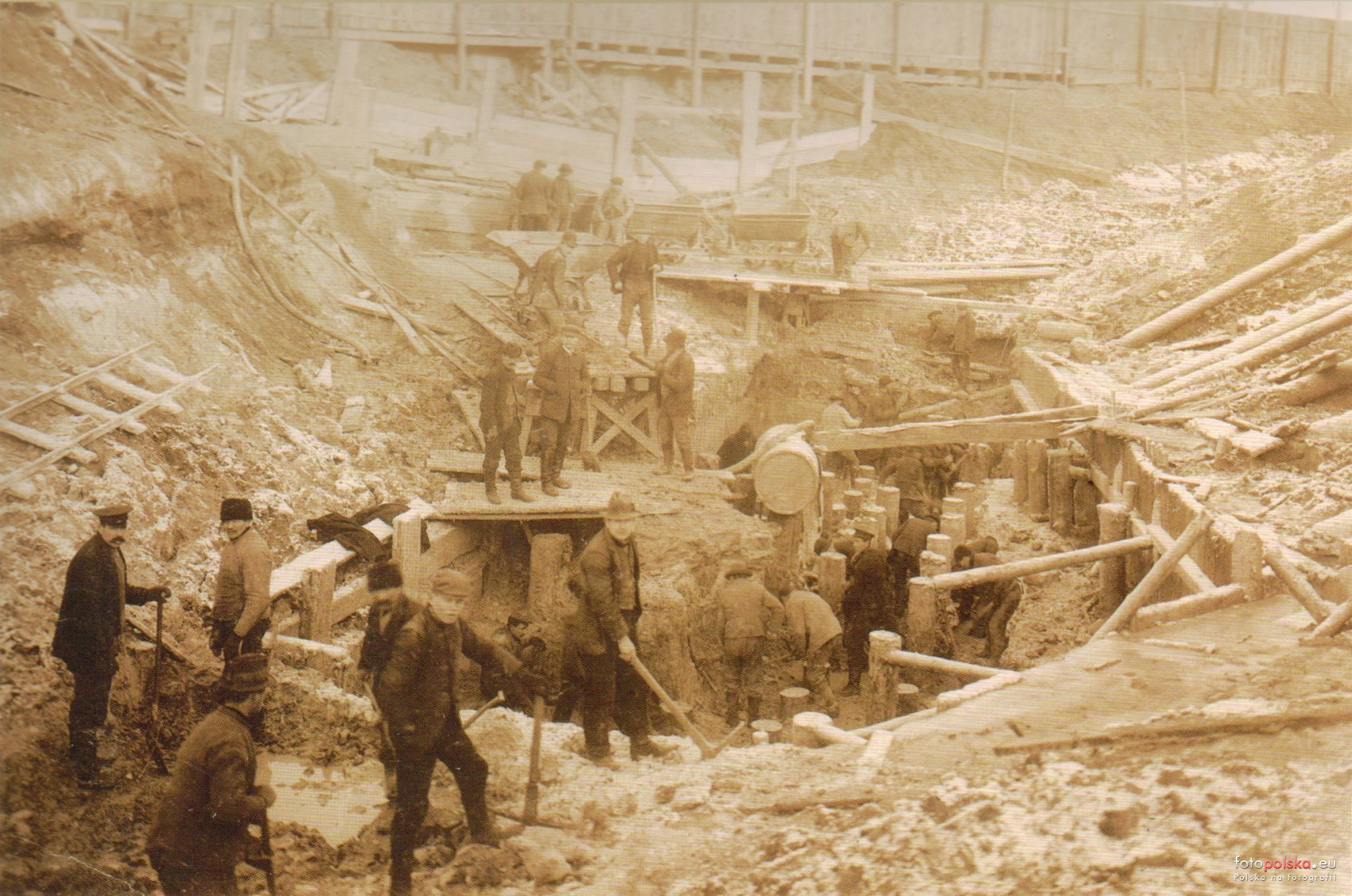
Workers on the area of the new canal, c. 1913

Soon, it appeared that new locks and pools for such large barges would be impossible to accommodate at the eastern entry of the canal. In consequence, it was decided to dig a new 1,630 metres (1.01 mi)-long canal section on the district of Okole (in Bydgoszcz) and to build two new, larger locks. Work was carried out between 1910 and 1913 to complete on Bydgoszcz premises:

- a new city lock (Śluza Miejska );
- a new Śluza Okole;
- a new Śluza Czyżkówko;
- a renovated Queen Jadwiga bridge on Królowej Jadwigi Street with higher clearance.

In addition, all other locks were remodeled, the canal deepened and 7 new locks installed on Noteć river.

The new waterway was put into service on 1 April 1915: the hydrotechnical achievement doubled the navigation capacity of the channel back in 1873. Full operations along the Vistula-Oder waterway were then halted by the outbreak of First World War.

A 3.5 kilometres (2.2 mi) long canal section of that time, together five locks, remained preserved as a storing area. Eventually, city authorities decided to transform this portion into fish ponds with plantations, called the Park on Bydgoszcz Canal; it is today a Polish natural reserve sector.

=== Interwar period and occupation ===
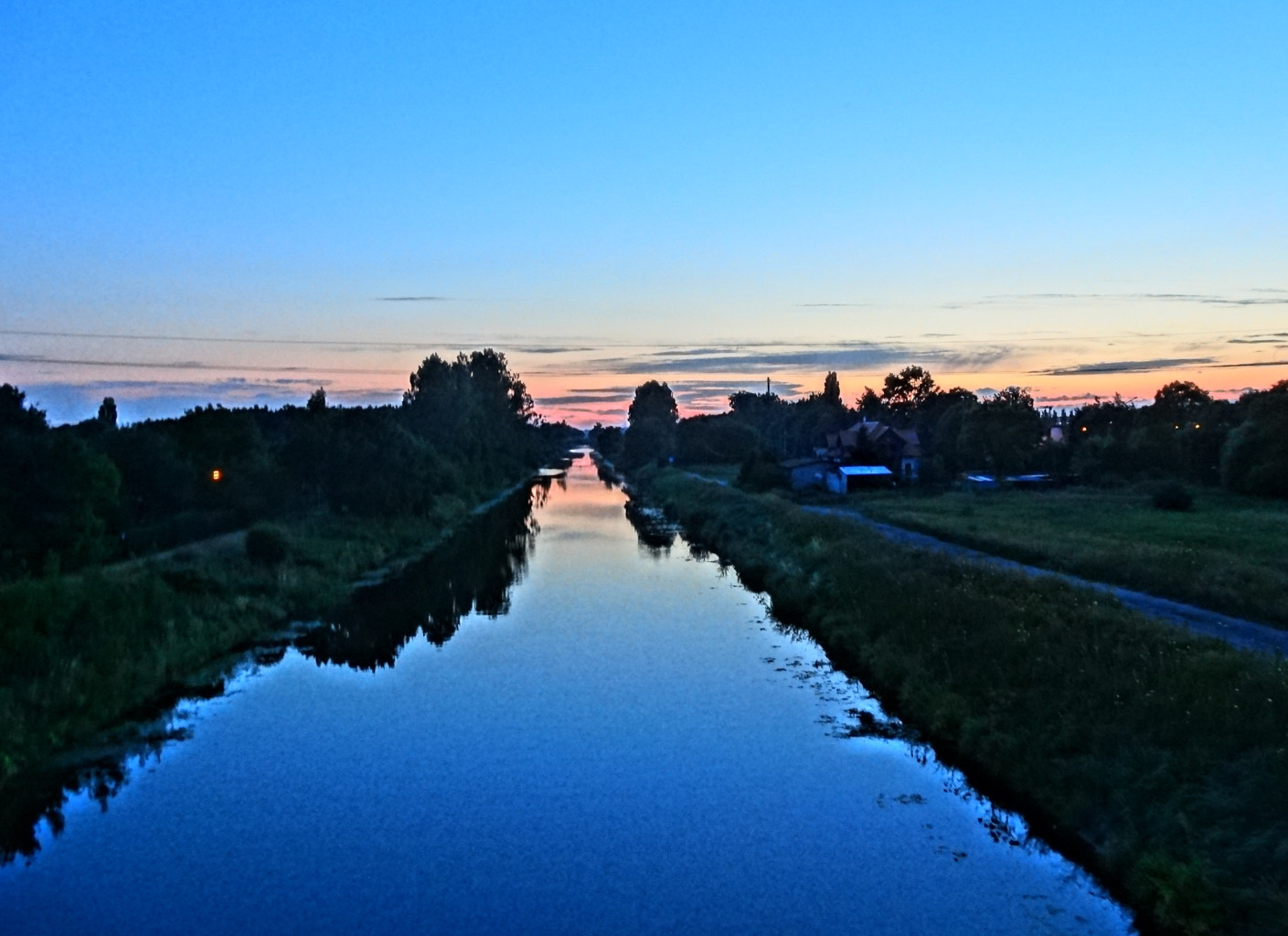
Bydgoszcz Canal by night

At the end of WWI, Bydgoszcz Canal and part of the Vistula-Oder Waterway were located within the boundaries of the newly reborn Second Polish Republic. The economic importance of the canal had declined, annual traffic reports were lower than those at the end of the 19th century: 196 000 tons in 1920 and 1927, while in 1900, 598 000 tons had been ferried. Even worse, during the 1930s, traffic dropped down to 100 000 tons. One of the main reason for this fall in activity was the high customs duties on Polish goods imposed by the German side. Indeed, Nazi Germany was, as before the first World War, the predominant importer of Polish goods: wood, mostly, was sold to the west, whereas seeds and fertilizer were imported to Poland. Shipping companies were flourishing at the time, e.g. the Lloyd Bydgoski, Bromberger Schleppschiffahrt, Towarzystwo Akcyjne, which operated from its seat in Bydgoszcz. In particular, waterway provided ferry to 94 000 tons of cargo between the western Reich territory and East Prussia (1938). Till the start of the Second World War, several schemes planned to re-vitalize waterways across Poland, to no avail:

- In the 1920s, a project of building a canal to link Silesia with the Vistula River at Bydgoszcz or Toruń was considered, so as to save money on coal transport, which was the Nr.1 export raw material of Poland at that time. In 1925, engineer Tadeusz Tillinger developed a plan for a 126 kilometres (78 mi) long channel joining Gopło lake to Vistula at the level of Łęgnowo (Bydgoszcz district), where a railway station was to connect to the inland port.
- In 1928, the Society for the Propaganda of Construction of Roads and Waterways in Poland (Polish: Towarzystwo Propagandy Budowy Dróg i Budowli Wodnych w Polsce) supported a project of a waterway from Upper Silesia to the area of Toruń, called Central Canal or Coal Canal. The channel was supposed to start from Katowice river harbour and run through Częstochowa, Radomsko, Piotrków Trybunalski, Łódź, Łęczyca, Koło, Gopło lake and Gniewkowo to join Vistula river below Torun. The water route was 411 kilometres (255 mi) long, passing through 39 locks. In addition, between Częstochowa and Łódź was planned a very complex system of mechanical dry locks.
- Another colossal project envisaged the realization of a 723 kilometres (449 mi) long canal dedicated to coal cargo, running parallel to the left bank of the Vistula river, from the port of Myslowice, via Kraków to Bydgoszcz. However, it meant bypassing many cities located on the left bank, like Warsaw, Płock, Włocławek or Toruń. The project also planned to build a gigantic hydroelectric power plant in Fordon, where channel water would flow into the Vistula River.

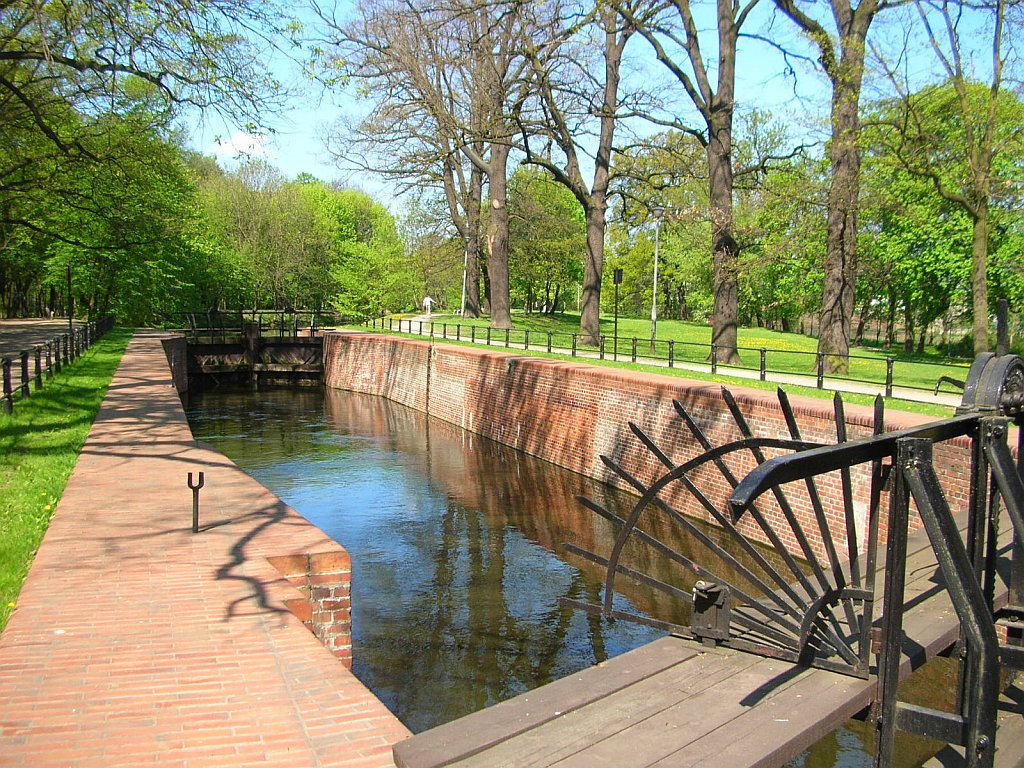
Restored locks on the old section

After the outbreak of World War II, Bydgoszcz canal was damaged by Polish sappers in September 1939. During the war, the canal was heavily used for the transport of bulk goods, since railroads were dedicated to the transport of war material. Among the never-achieved plans of the Nazi authorities was the so-called Bydgoszcz bypass: a channel running from Śluza Osowa Góra and connecting directly with the Vistula river via the north of Fordon district.

Bydgoszcz canal did not suffer from the war, if one excludes several acts of vandalism committed by Red Army soldiers that have been fiercely parried by Stanisław Marian Tychoniewicz, then head of Bydgoszcz State Water Council.

=== Post war period ===
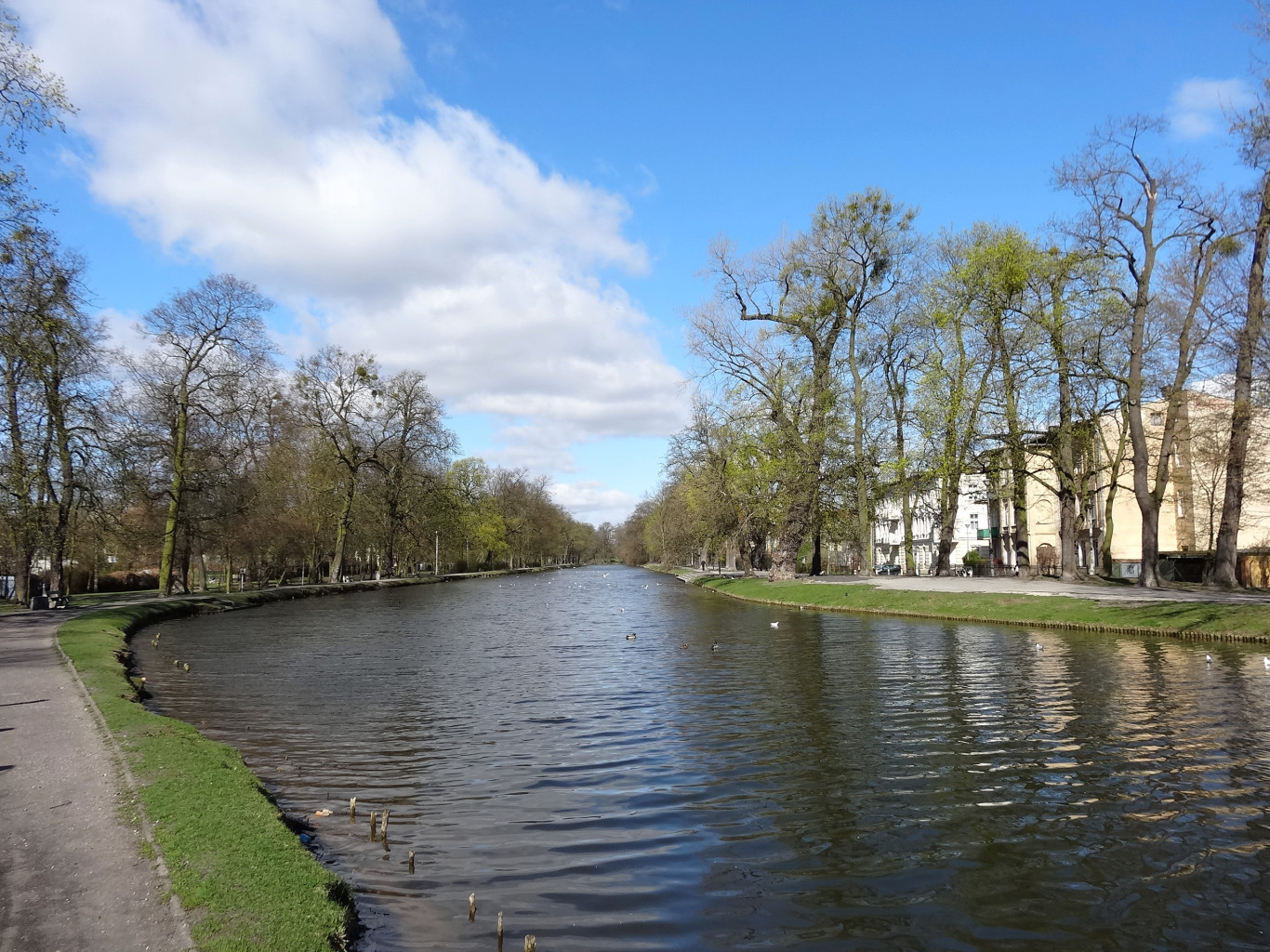
Old Bydgoszcz canal natural park

After World War II, no thorough modernization of Bydgoszcz Canal facilities have been performed, albeit it was at the time the second artificial waterway in economic terms (after the Gliwice Canal built in the 1930s) in the country. In 1972, 500 metres (1,600 ft) of canal were covered and two locks were razed due to the extension of Marshal Ferdinand Foch Street.

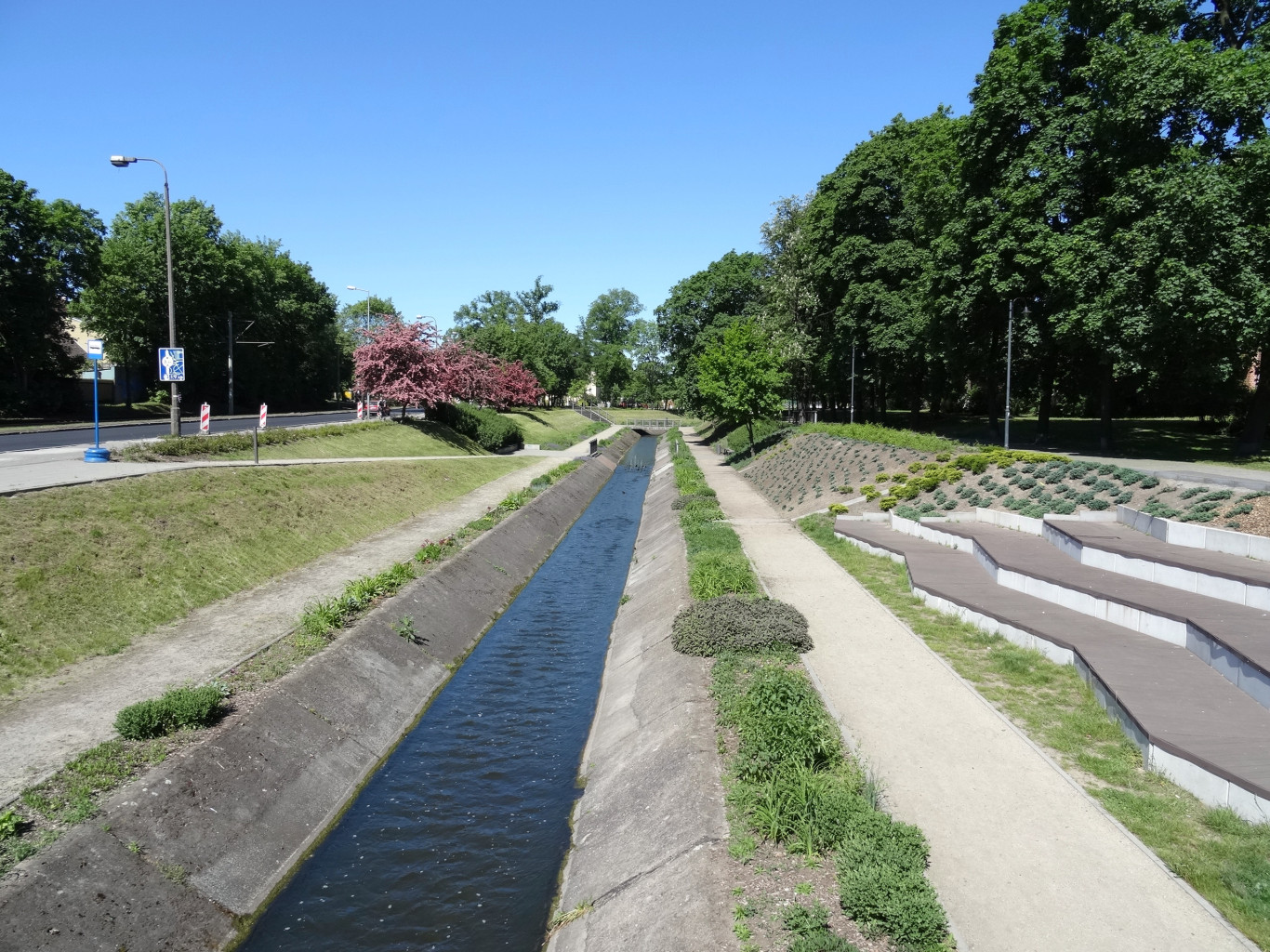
Renovated section of the canal

In 1951, the state-owned Bydgoszcz Shipping company (Polish: Żegluga Bydgoska) was established, managing inland ports located along the Vistula-Oder waterway: Bydgoszcz, Ujście, Krzyż Wielkopolski, Kostrzyn nad Odrą and Poznań. Post-war transport of freight traffic on the Canal reached its peak in the 1970s, but after 1980, it quickly collapsed. As far as canal investments are concerned, only the section of Brda river witnessed a modernization in 1970, together with Bydgoszcz shipping port facilities (new quay and set up of five massive cranes).

In the 1990s, revitalization of the Bydgoszcz Canal began:

- between 1992 and 1996, the Old Bydgoszcz canal natural park portion had three locks restorated;
- in 2005, Bydgoszcz Canal and its hydrotechnical equipment were registered on the Kuyavian-Pomeranian Voivodeship Heritage List;
- in 2006, the Bydgoszcz Canal Museum was established;
- in the years 2008–2012, the eastern part of the closed channel (downtown Bydgoszcz) was modernized.

In addition, regarding environmental concerns, between 2006 and 2012, canal sewage treatment plant on Prady district was demolished and dredging of bottom sediments was carried out within Bydgoszcz city premises.

== Overall characteristics ==
The total length of Bydgoszcz Canal is 24.77 kilometres (15.39 mi), of which 15.7 kilometres (9.8 mi) are located in Oder river basin and 9 kilometres (5.6 mi) in Brda river basin (part of Vistula basin). The level discrepancy is managed by six water locks. The canal exits Bydgoszcz city territory through Osowa Góra lock and reaches Nakło premises at Józefinki lock.

The width of waterway varies from 28 metres (92 ft) to 30 metres (98 ft), its depth from 1.6 metres (5.2 ft) to 2 metres (6.6 ft), depending on the damming level. The channel is accessible to boats with a carrying capacity of 400 t and a draft of 1.5 to 1.6 m. Navigation period is from April to November. Bydgoszcz canal is supplied with water from two main sources:

- the Kanał Górnonotecki, providing water from the upper areas of Nakło city. This channel receives supply from the town of Dębinek, via a 600m long two-branches duct;
- small streams and brooks within Bydgoszcz area (e.g. Struga Młyńska, Potok Prądy, Potok Kruszyński).

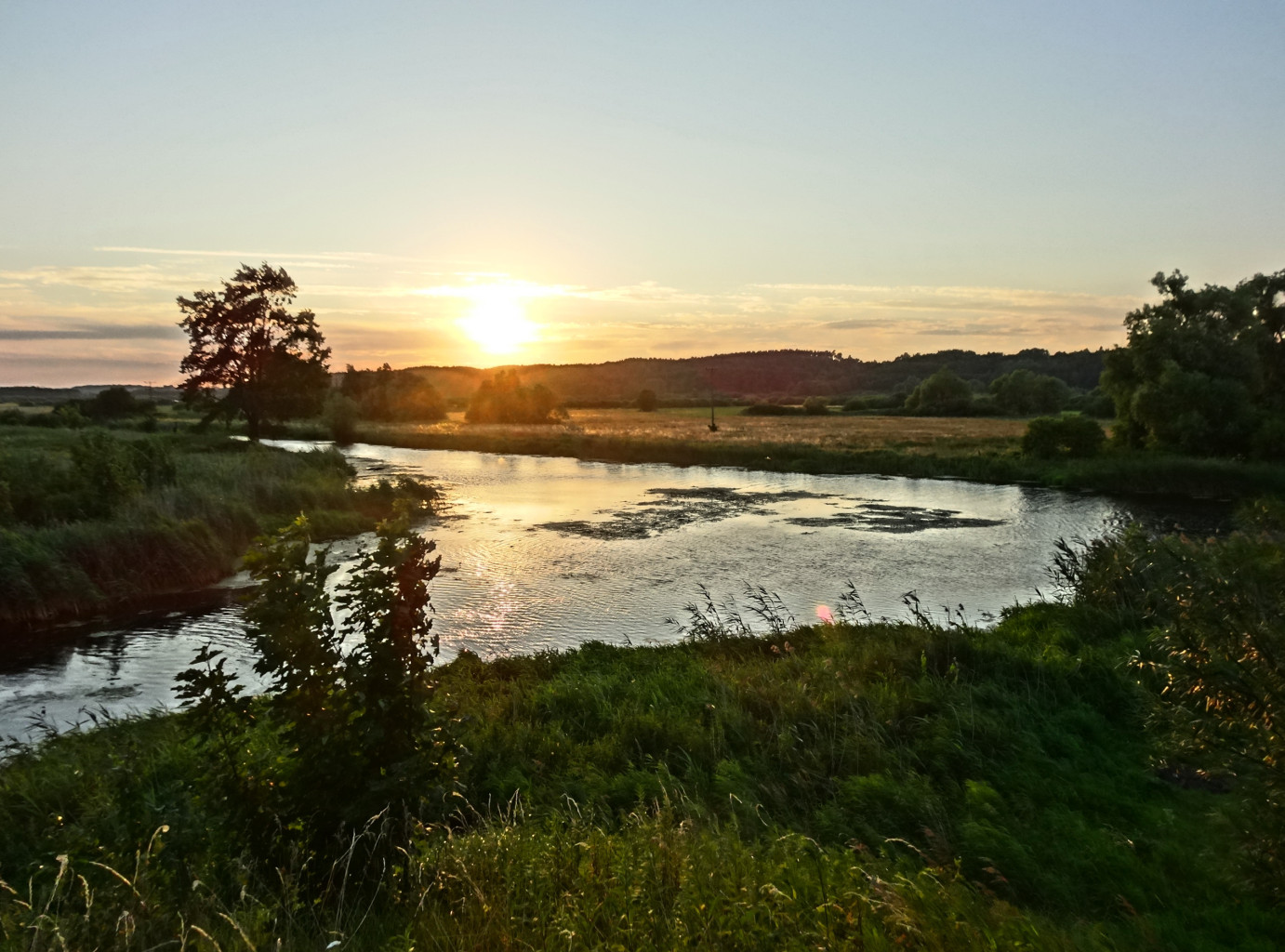
View of estuary of the Górnonotecki Canal

Water overflow in the canal use two streams:

- an eastward one, towards Brda river, with an average flow of 486 L/s;
- a westward branch flows towards Notec river, passing by the Józefinki lock in Nakło and pouring through a stream called Paramelka to the river.

Bydgoszcz Canal elements, apart from locks, comprise:

- five baffles segments - wall across the flow, downstream of a fall, creating a water cushion on the upstream;
- towpaths on both sides, used by haulers;
- a weir to drain excess water at Śluza Józefinki;
- a siphon above the Okole lock, carrying out water into the Flis river;
- the Górnonotecki Canal built in 1878–1882 used to supply water to the highest point of Bydgoszcz canal and allowing traffic for small boats units (25 kilometres (16 mi) long);
- in Dębinek, the so-called Bydgoszcz meadows over the Noteć (Polish: Bydgoskie Łąki Nadnoteckie), a specific pool receiving flowing waters of the Noteć river and directing part of them for Bydgoszcz Canal. This area is delimited by five chambers (equipped with locks) and two weirs (Dębinek and Łochowo weirs).

== Locks ==
Along its length, Bydgoszcz canal controls six locks managing its navigation flow. The variations of water level of these locks range from 1.81 metres (5.9 ft) at Śluza Józefinki to 7.58 metres (24.9 ft) at Śluza Okole and Śluza Czyżkówko, both equipped with dedicated tanks.

Four locks are located on the eastern segment of the route, within Bydgoszcz territory, since the canal reaches its highest point about 2 km west of the city limits, where Vistula and Oder river basins divide. On a 6 kilometres (3.7 mi) long section, water level is raised by 22.5 metres (74 ft). In its heyday, this short canal portion was called the Brda Stairs.

Passed these 4 locks, the way westward runs on 16.5 kilometres (10.3 mi) at its highest water level: on the past, barges were hauled on this section by burlaks. Further west, the path joins Nakło nad Notecią via two locks that lower the water level by 3.74 metres (12.3 ft).

Śluza Okole lock and Śluza Czyżkówko lock are the most recent locks, built between 1910 and 1915, when the canal underwent a thorough modernization to allow 400t-tonnage barges navigation. Both are 57.4 metres (188 ft) long and 9.6 metres (31 ft) wide.

Locks on Bydgoszcz Canal

Name	Location	Position along the canal from Vistula to Oder	Water level variation [ m ]	Year of construction	Last renovated
Śluza Okole	Bydgoszcz, Okole district	14,8 km	7,58	1913–1915	1915
Śluza Czyżkówko	Bydgoszcz, Flisy district	16,0 km	7,52	1913–1915	1915
Śluza Prądy	Bydgoszcz, Prądy district	20,0 km	3,82	1774	1914
Śluza Osowa Góra	Bydgoszcz, Osowa Góra district	21,0 km	3,55	1774	1914
Śluza Józefinki	Nakło nad Notecią	37,2 km	1,83	1774	1914
Śluza Nakło Wschód (Nakło East)	Nakło nad Notecią	38,9 km	1,91	1774	1914

Locks of the Bydgoszcz canal
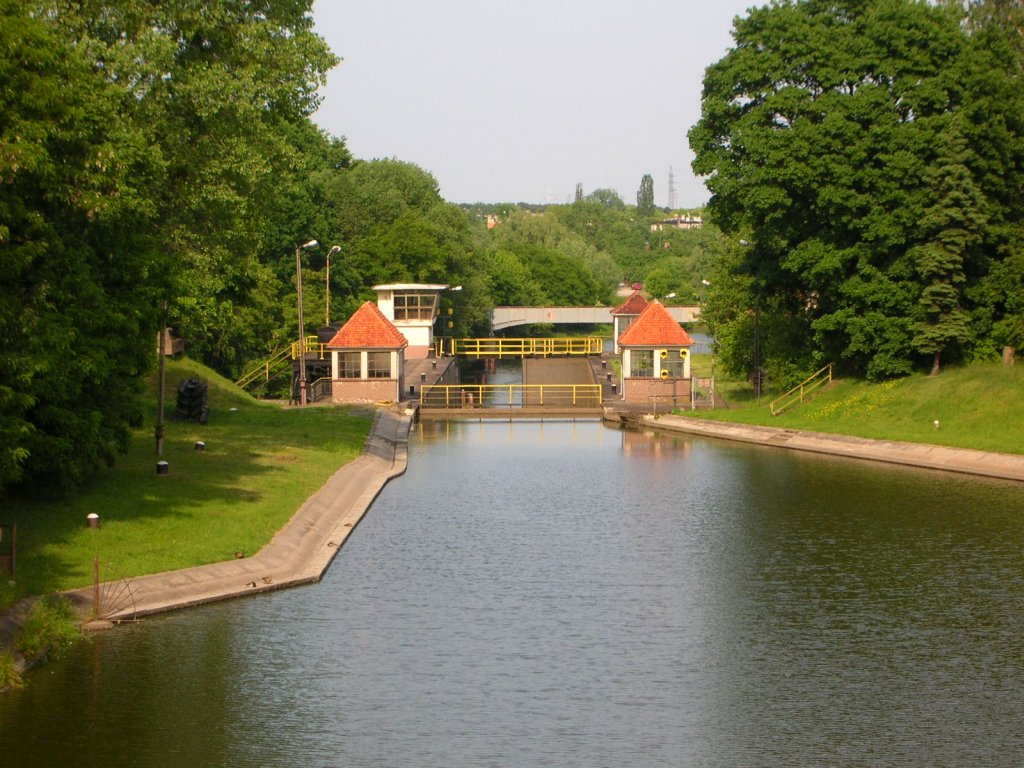
Okole Lock (Śluza Okole)

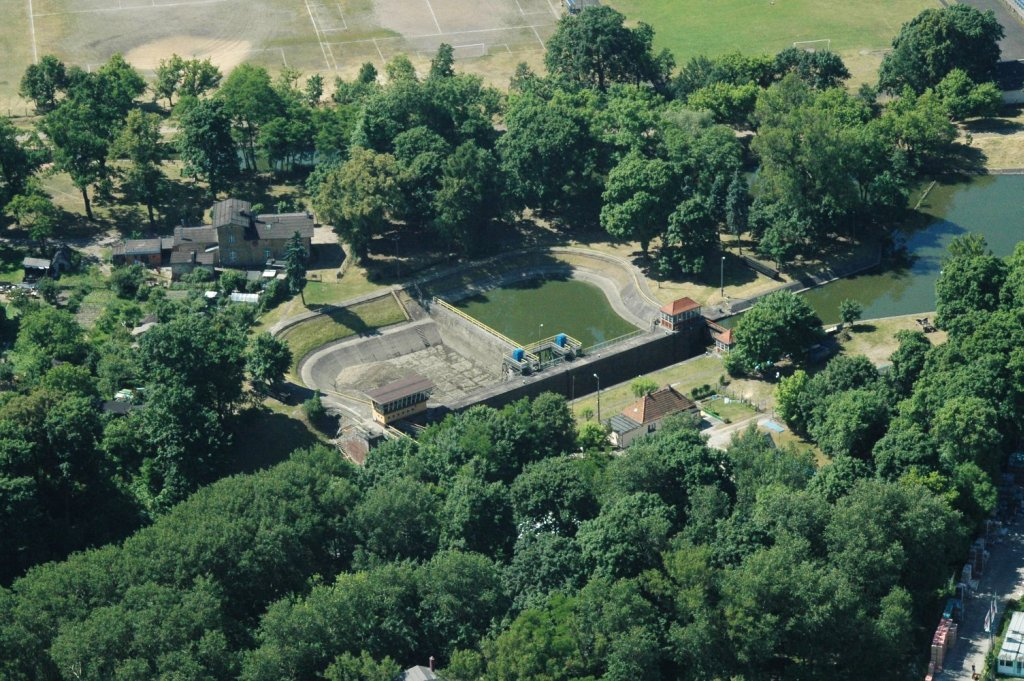
Czyżkówko Lock (Śluza Czyżkówko), bird eye view

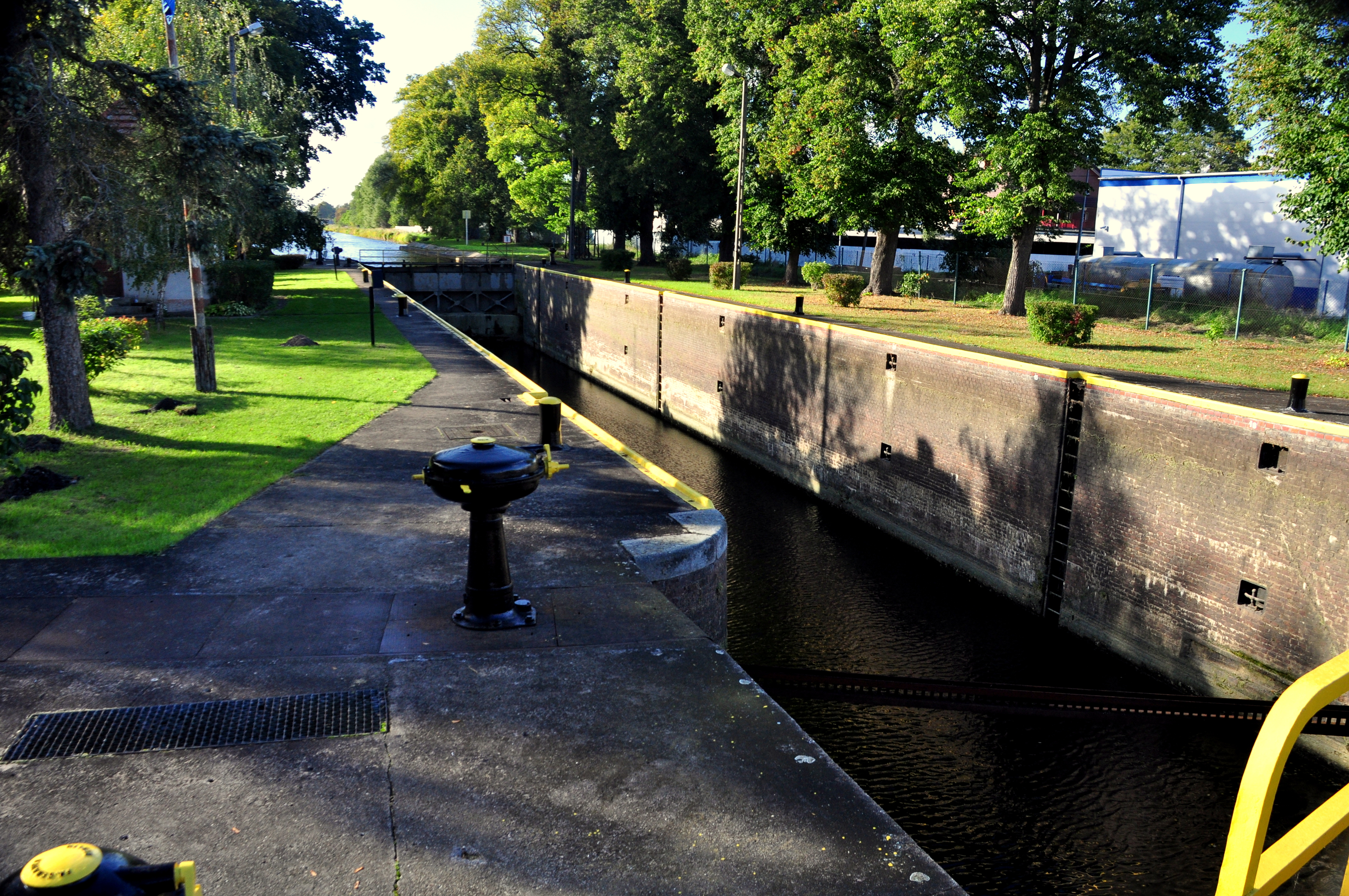
Prądy lock (Śluza Prądy)

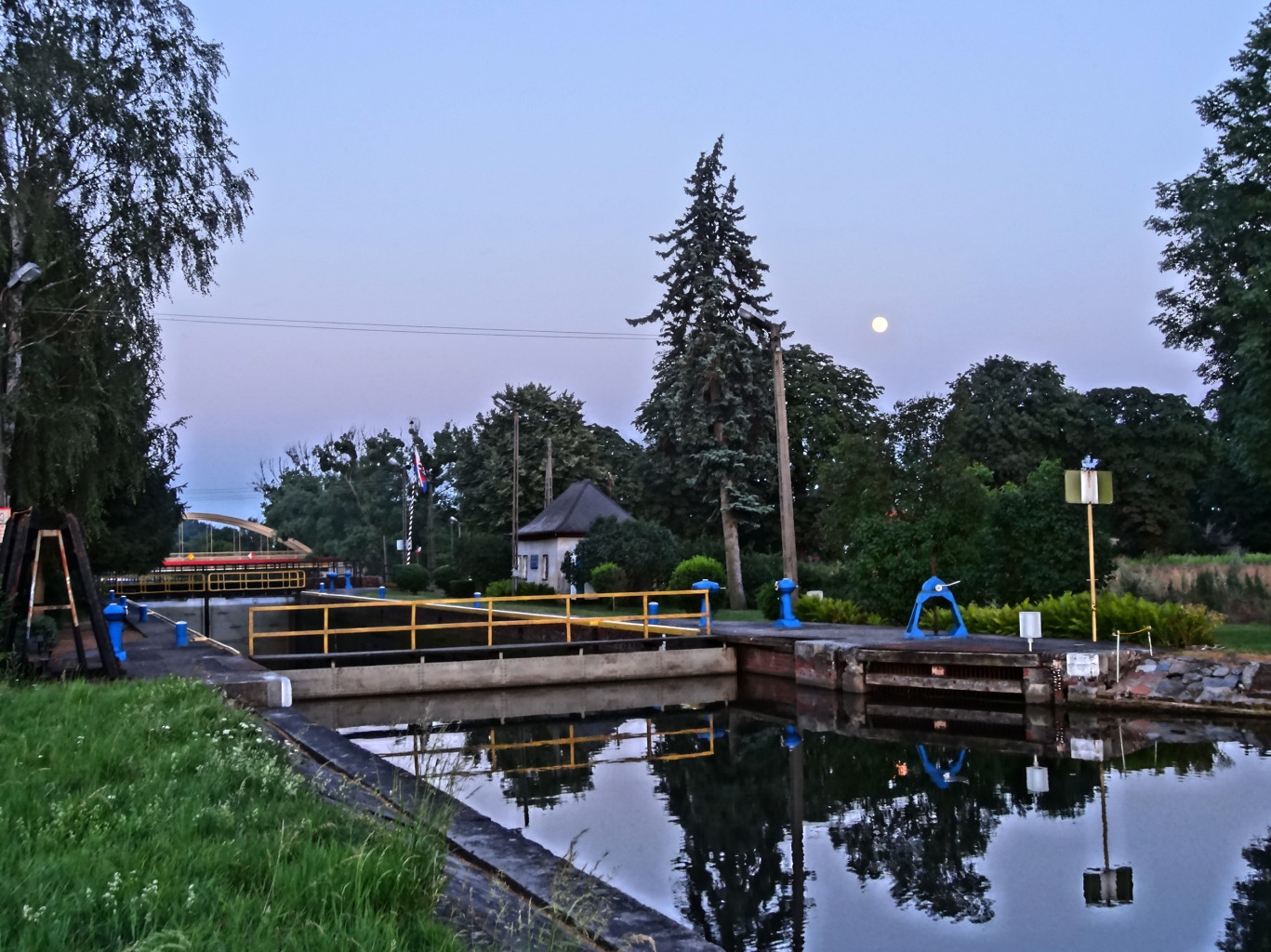
Osowa Gora lock (Śluza Osowa Góra )

Along the 3 kilometres (1.9 mi) long section of the Old Bydgoszcz Canal, in Bydgoszcz (Okole district), one can find three additional locks, which are now used as weirs. They are listed as heritage technology sites, part of the Old Bydgoszcz canal natural park on Nakielska Street.

Locks on the section of the Old Bydgoszcz canal

Name	Position along the canal from Vistula to Oder	Water level variation [ m ]	Year of construction	Last renovated
Śluza IV Wrocławska	13,6 km	2,5	1774	1810
Śluza V Czarna Droga (Black Path)	14,6 km	1,5	1774	1807
Śluza VI Bronikowskiego	15,4 km	1,9	1774	1810

Locks of the Old Bydgoszcz canal
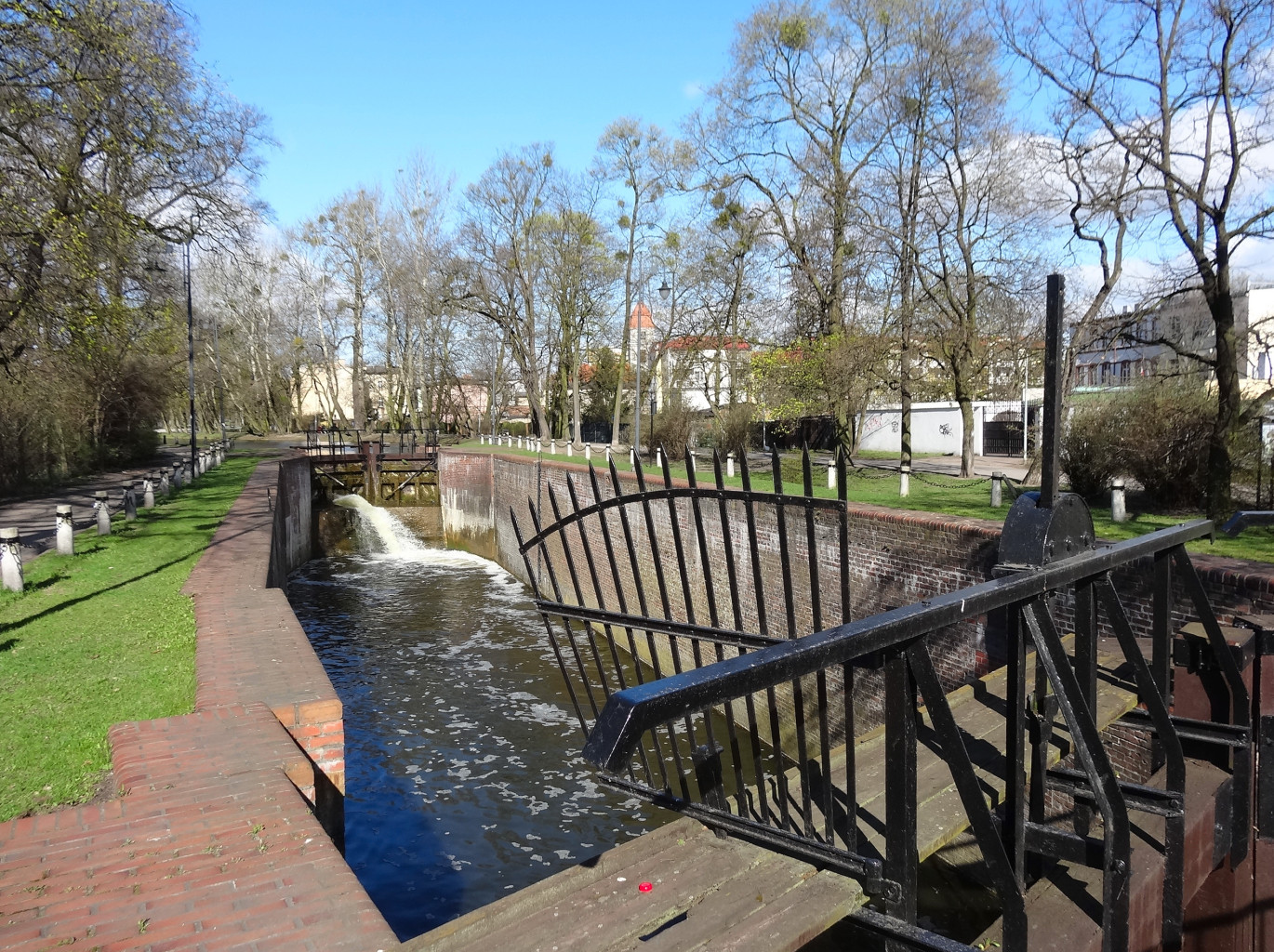
Old lock Nr.4 (Śluza IV Wrocławska)

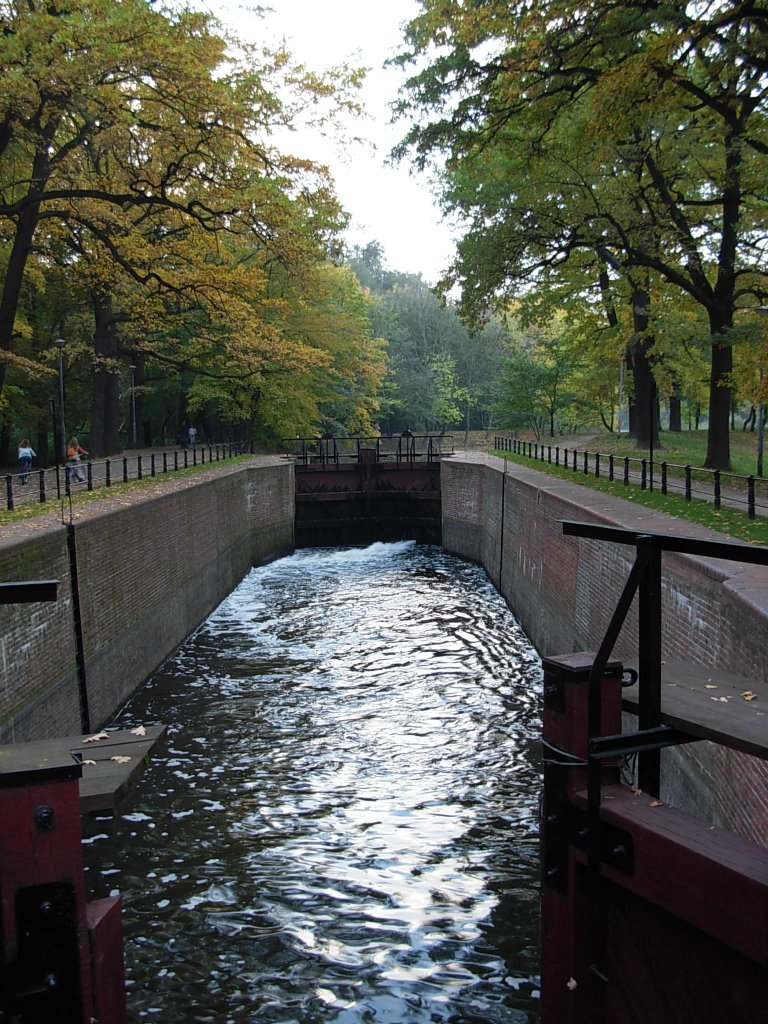
Old lock Nr.5 (Śluza V Czarna Droga)

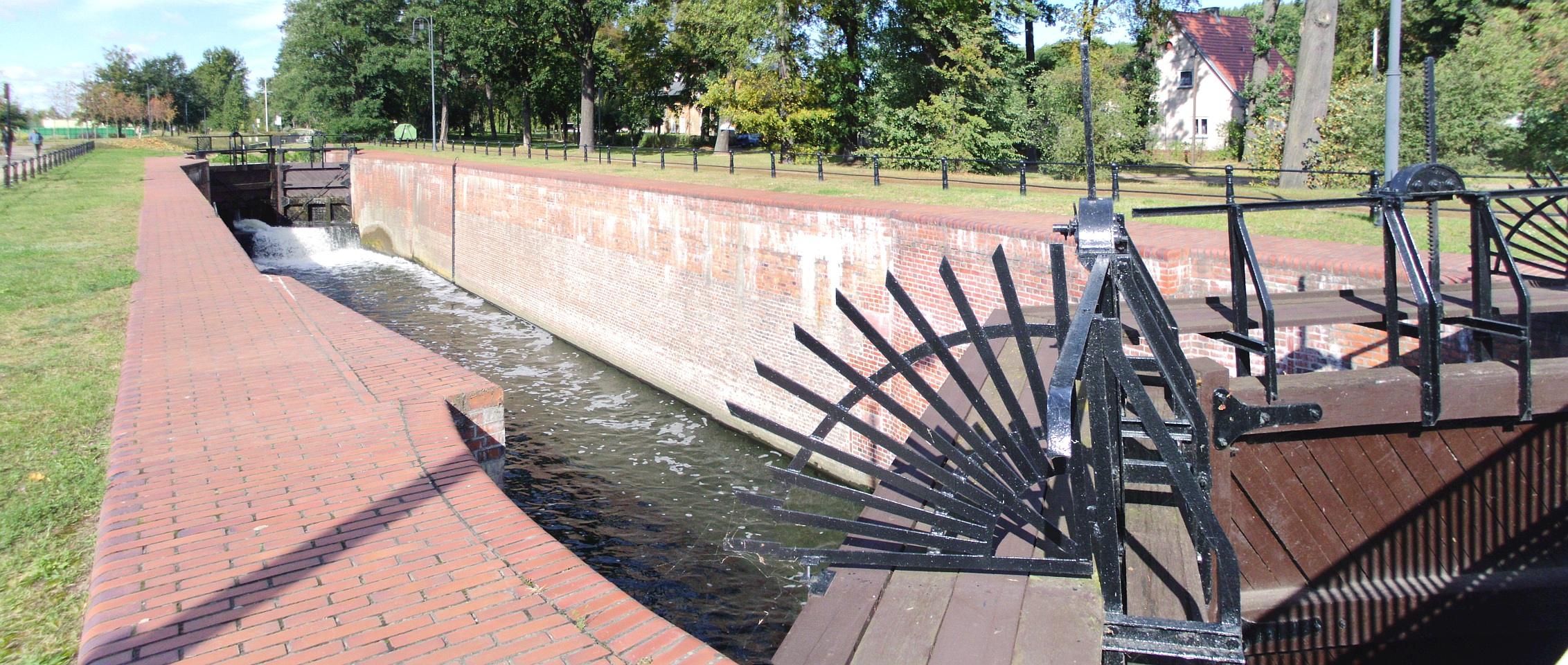
Old lock Nr.6 (Śluza VI Bronikowskiego)

Two locks of the Old Canal have been demolished in 1970 (Śluza II Św. Trójcy and Śluza III Grunwaldzka), during the extension works of western end of Marshal Ferdinand Foch Street.

== Impact on the society ==
=== Cargo activity (1774–1912) ===
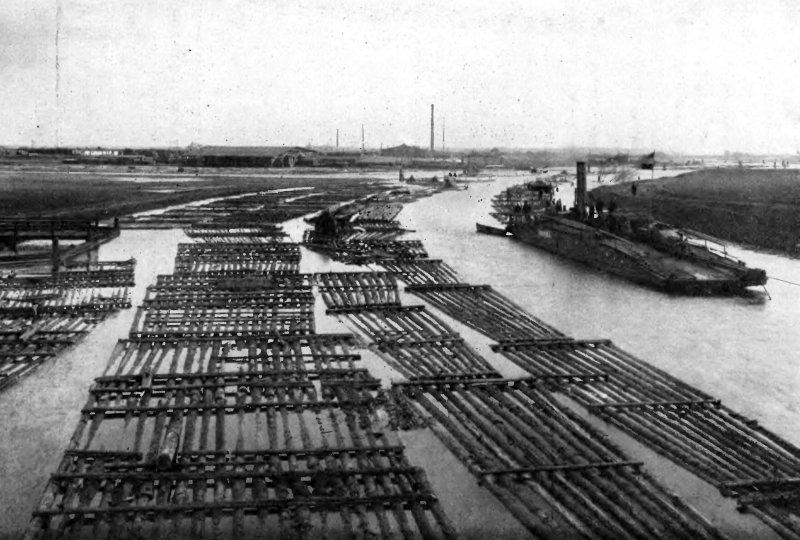
Wood rafting and towing in Bydgoszcz, c. 1905

First traffic on the Bydgoszcz Canal started with two lime boats in their way to Bydgoszcz in June 1774. At that time, the city was only 500 inhabitants strong: The construction of the canal was a real game changer in the development of the city. Initially, there were as many sailing boats as wood rafts. The main flow of traffic was westwards: about 60% of traffic in the first half of the 19th century and up to 80% between 1872 and 1912. From 1870 to 1900, around 85% of the traffic was performed by wood rafting, to Berlin, Szczecin and central German Empire. In 1800, Bromberg had 4500 inhabitants, growing to 14,000 in 1849.

At its inception (beginning of the 19th century), the Bydgoszcz Canal could accept 200-tons cargo boats, but Prussian authorities allowed only 40 tons of tonnage per boat. Things changed a bit and at the end of the 19th century, the average capacity of boats on the canal was 130 tons and 200 tons in 1905. However, channel capacity was always limited by its shallow depth and the associated danger of shoals. In 1885, the first steam-engine boats appeared, plying between Warsaw, Toruń, Bydgoszcz, Gdańsk and Elbląg.

Wood rafted through the canal, of which the vast majority was pine, originated mostly from the Congress Poland (75%), but also from Galicia (12%), Russian Empire (5%) and Tuchola Forest (6%). Almost the entire transport of wood was channeled into central Germany: Berlin, Magdeburg, Hamburg, Dresden and lands over the Elbe and Havel. As far as traffic is concerned, peak activity for Bydgoszcz canal had stretched on a 40-year period, from 1870 to 1910.

=== Economy ===
The immediate impact of the Canal on the environment was the drainage of wetlands, marshes and peatlands, which facilitated the development of agriculture. The second and more basic importance of Bydgoszcz Canal was its role as means of communication, between basins of Oder and Vistula rivers. Till the 1980s, the canal acted as a route, playing a decisive economic role: it thus contributed to the development of Bydgoszcz, Kuyavia and Pałuki areas by flowing into Germany agricultural and natural resources from these regions. Other regions indirectly benefited from the Bydgoszcz Canal, like East Prussia, West Pomerania and central Germany (Szczecin, Berlin, Hambourg, Brandenburg) from where industrial goods were exported eastward.

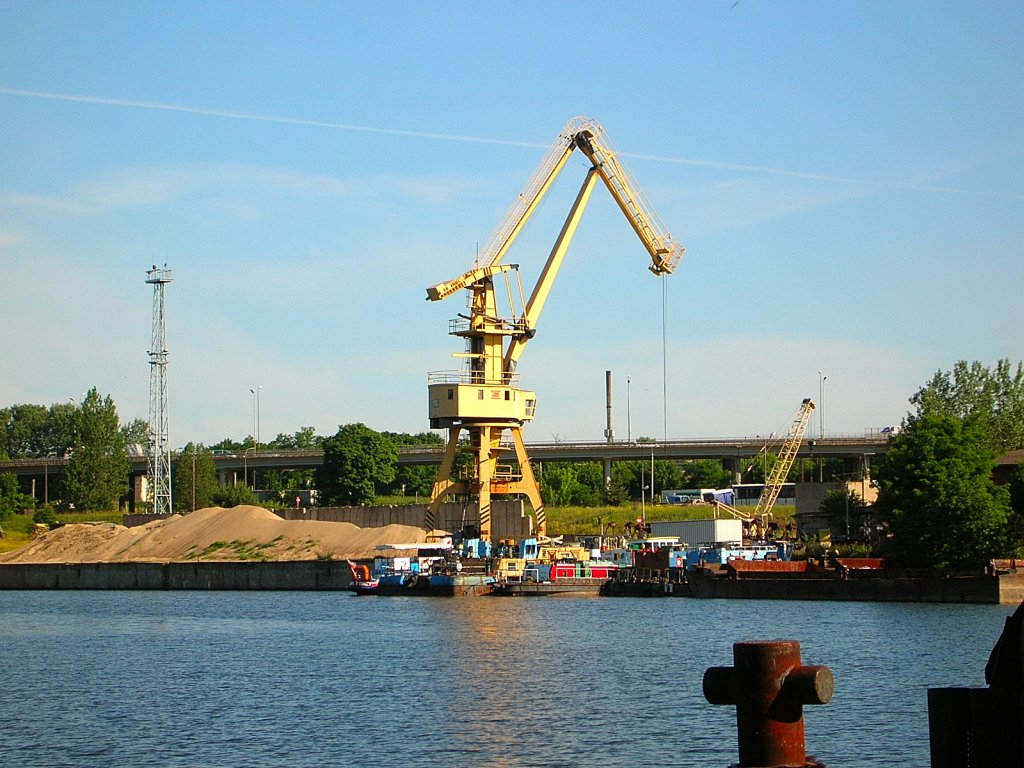
Crane in Bydgoszcz inland harbour

Locally, the canal brought new investments to the city of Bydgoszcz, creating new factories, brickworks and sawmills. In 1897, Bydgoszcz counted three times more workers and sailors than Gdańsk, and six times more than Poznań. Initially a city with wealth based on grain (storage and milling) imported from Poland, Bydgoszcz became at the eve of the 20th century a large center for trade and wood industry, thanks to its canal. The city was a go-between in the supply of timber and grain from the east, and machinery and industrial products from the west.

The channelling of the Brda river in 1879 and the establishment of the Bydgoszcz shipping company led to the creation of an inland port river port in Brdyujście district, accompanied with an entire fleet of factories and the so-called "East Industrial District". The availability of berths and the growing freight traffic boosted the development of commercial and manufacturing businesses in the metropolitan area. Wood industry had a leading role: in 1906, about 4.8 million m^{3} was supplied to Germany, accounting for 33% of the annual timber import. Wharfs were laid on several kilometers, busy with sawmills, and in Bydgoszcz was established the only Wood exchange market in the Polish interwar period.

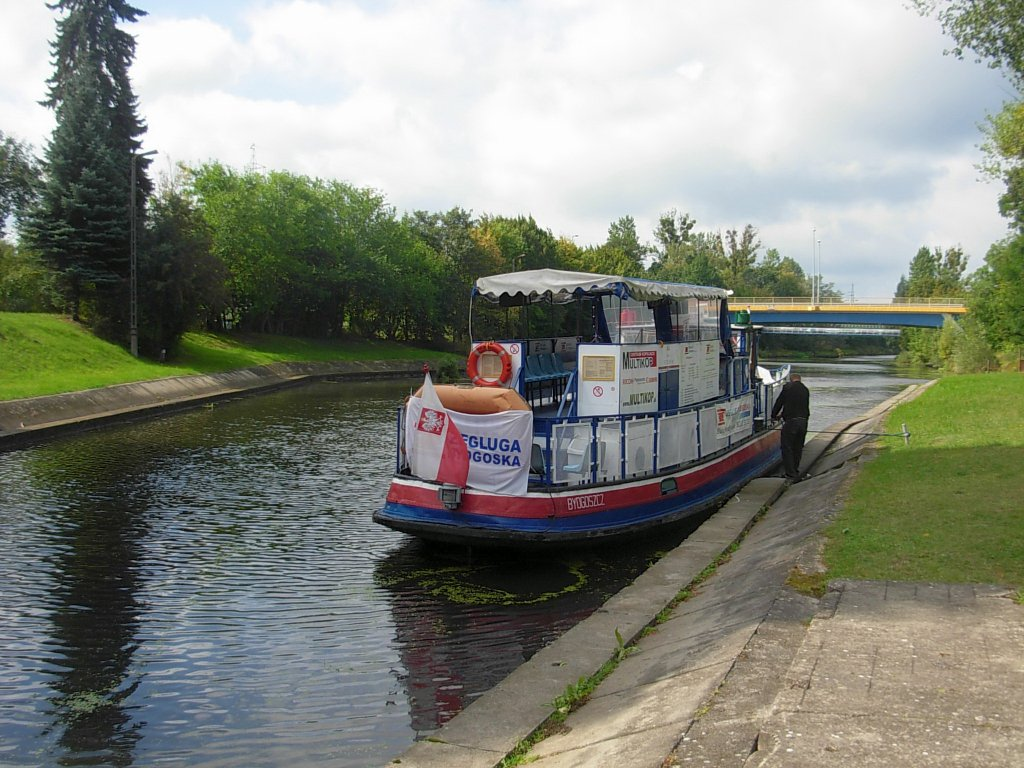
Bydgoski water tram near Okole lock

The channel has been competing relatively well with rail and car transport for a long time. A significant reduction in freight traffic occurred only after 1965. Today, current transport through the Canal -as well as on the entire Vistula-Oder Waterway- is relatively small compared to its potential (up to several hundred thousand tons annually).

=== Tourism ===
Since the middle of the 19th century, the Bydgoszcz Canal has been used for tourism and passenger transport. During interwar period, as well as after WWII, tourist ships have been plying between Bydgoszcz and Nakło nad Notecia. After a decline in the 1970s and 1980s, the importance of the Vistula-Oder waterway has risen again since the 1990s. Some towns such as Santok, Nakło nad Notecią or Bydgoszcz have started to build tourist infrastructure focusing on the canal theme.

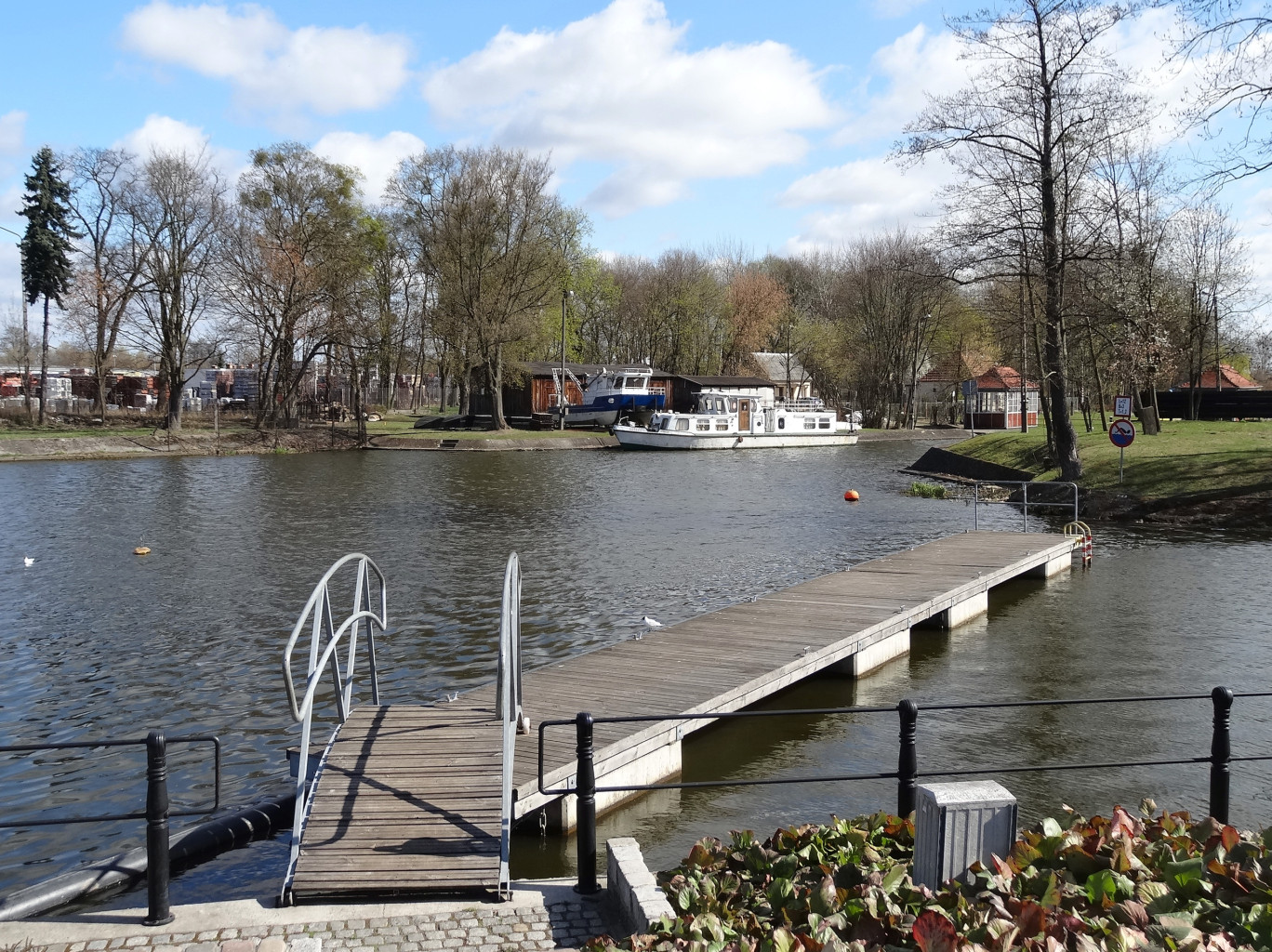
View of the marina

In Bydgoszcz, the trail created combines a natural area (most of it is part of the Natura 2000 network), a national park, a Nature reserve and a landscape park. It also displays historic hydrotechnical objects and architectural monuments in the heart of the city.

Moreover, the Vistula-Oder waterway is now connected, via the canal, with several other watercourses attracting tourists: the Lubuskie Water Trail, the Great Loop of Wielkopolska (Polish: Wielka Pętla Wielkopolski), the Kujawska Loop (Polish: Pętla Kujawska) and Warta, Brda or Lower Vistula rivers. In 2007, seven voivodships lying on the path of the E70 waterway have signed an agreement on the revitalization of this water channel.

In 2009, Bydgoszcz marina had been opened, nearby the central Śluza Czyżkówko, offering berths for about 15 vessels. A water tram, (Polish: Bydgoski Tramwaj Wodny), has been running since 2004 every summer along the channeled Brda river in downtown Bydgoszcz.

Since 2008, a Marathon run has been held on the Old Bydgoszcz Canal.

=== Bydgoszcz Canal Museum ===
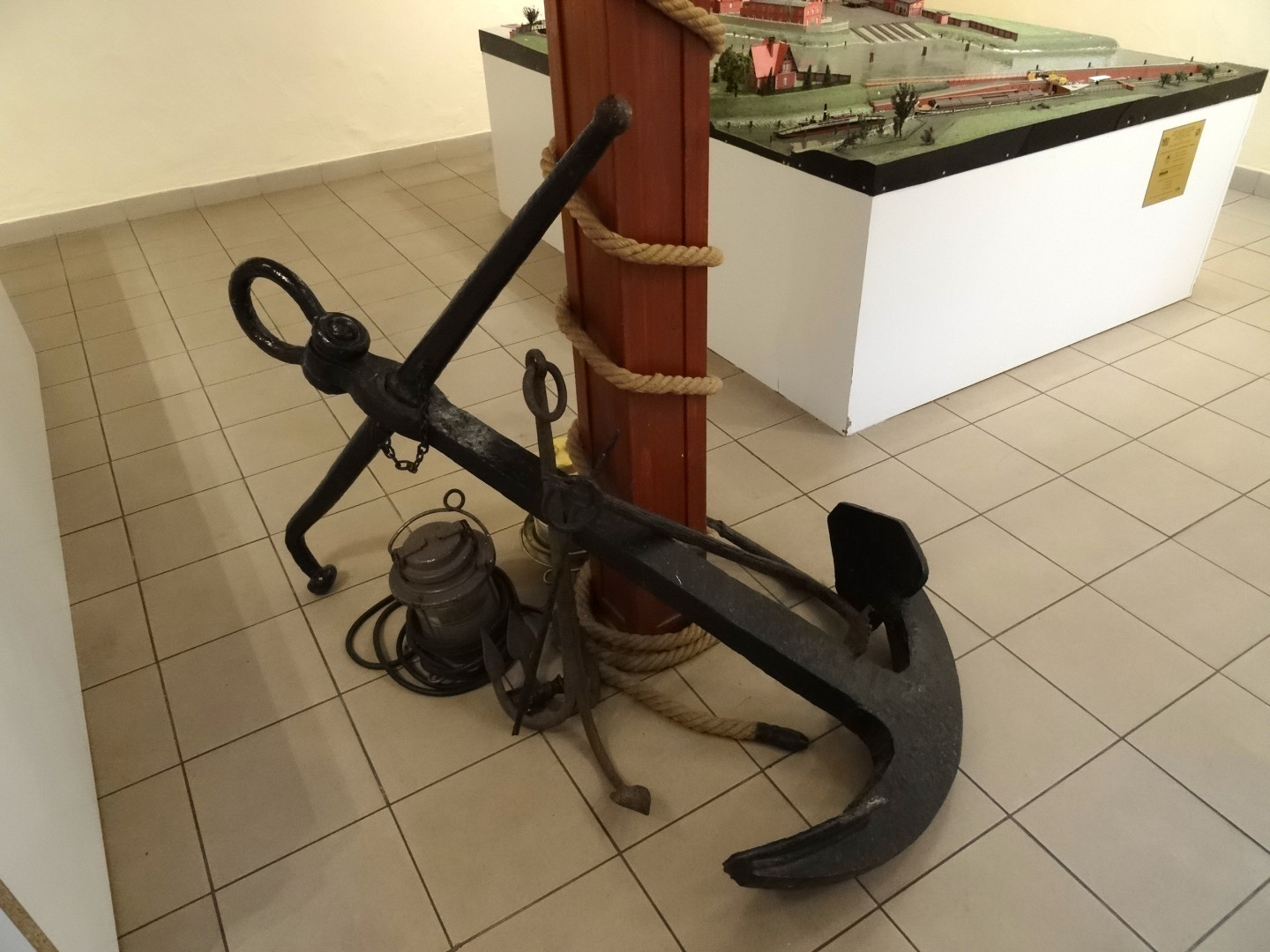
Artefacts exhibited in the museum

The Museum of the Bydgoszcz Canal is located in a 19th-century building, in the courtyard of a Bydgoszcz Secondary School (III Liceum Ogólnokształcące im. Adama Mickiewicza w Bydgoszczy, III LO), on the northern bank of the channel. Its creation is entirely the work of Sebastian Malinowski, a historian, teacher and social activist. The idea was born in 2004, at the occasion of the celebration of the 230th anniversary of the construction of the canal. A founding committee meeting was first held on 31 March 2005 in III LO premises, itself located since 1879 on the very area of the Old Bydgoszcz canal natural park. Funders and contractors for the repair of the building were local entrepreneurs, especially Krzysztof Wiśniewski.

On 29 September 2006 the museum was re-opened in a renovated room of III LO. A historical-literary symposium has been held opportunely, gathering historians, scientists and writers from Bydgoszcz and the region. Sebastian Malinowski was the first custodian of the Museum from September 2006 to his premature death in February 2008.

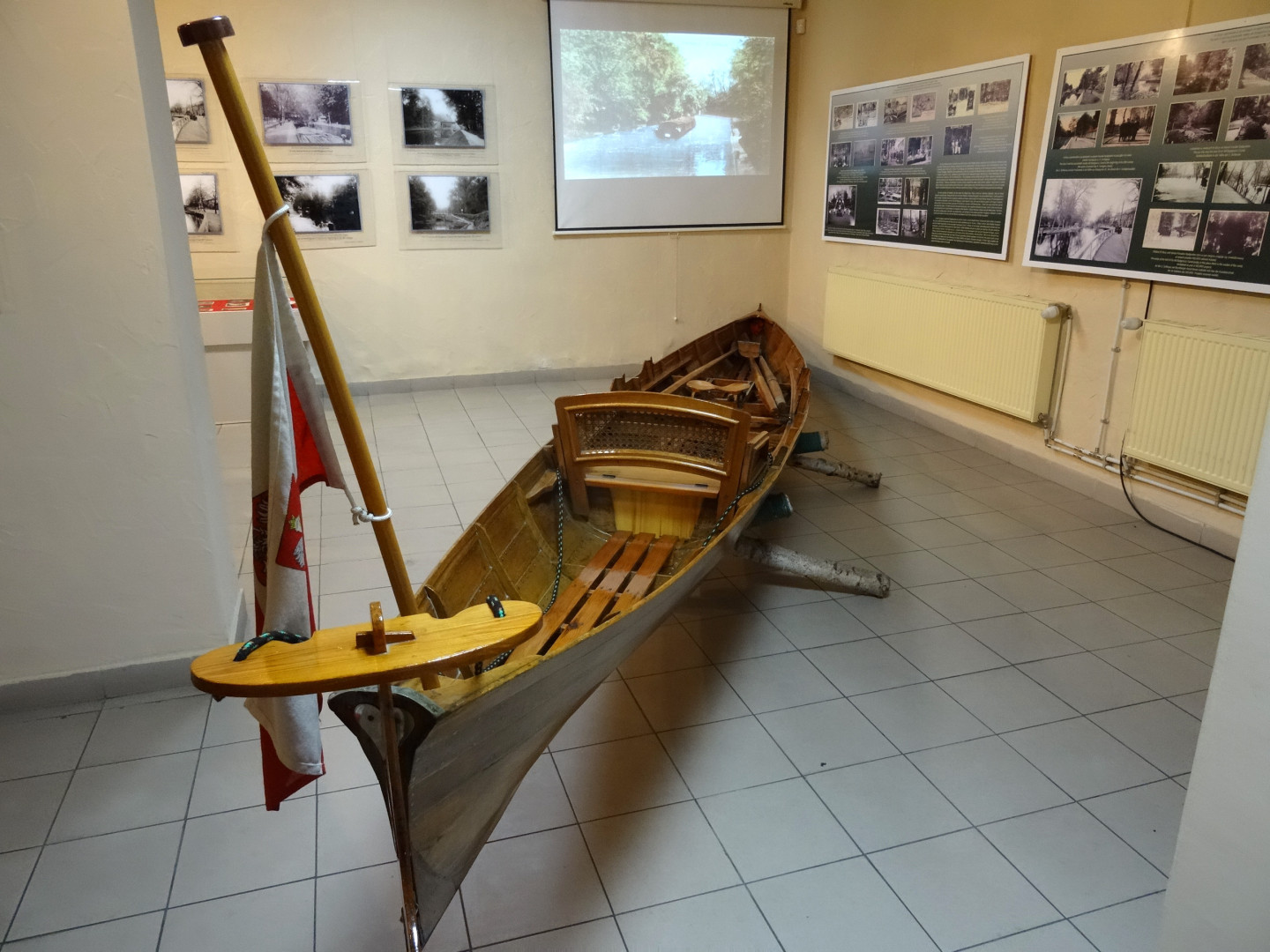
1920 oak rowing boat

The museum pedagogical objectives are:

- collecting and sharing of memorabilia related to the Bydgoszcz canal;
- saving the memory of channel's creators and the people whose lives have been devoted to Inland Navigation and hydrotechnics;
- presenting Bydgoszcz city seen from the perspective of water, and the role of the Bydgoszcz canal in Poland and in Europe;
- disseminating the tradition of trade and shipping in Bydgoszcz;
- explaining the history of the Old Bydgoszcz canal natural park.

The museum displays photographs and artefacts depicting Bydgoszcz Canal, the work, the sailing and everyday life around the channel. The exhibition items include, among others:

- a copy of Christian Rode's picture Frederick the Great watching blueprint of the Bydgoszcz Canal;
- inland waterways sailors' uniforms;
- an oak rowing boat from 1920, used on the Brda river and the canal until the second half of the 20th century;
- items related to the work of barges.

The Museum of the Bydgoszcz Canal also conducts educational activities, interactive lessons on the History of Bydgoszcz Waterways and sailing in Bydgoszcz.

== Bibliography ==
- Badtke, Marek (2002). Powrót nad kanał. Kalendarz Bydgoski (in Polish). Bydgoszcz: Towarzystwo Miłośników Miasta Bydgoszczy.
- Bartowski, Krzysztof (2005). W 231. rocznicę Kanału Bydgoskiego (1774-2005). Materiały do dziejów kultury i sztuki Bydgoszczy i regionu, z. 10 (in Polish). Bydgoszcz: Pracownia Dokumentacji i Popularyzacji Zabytków Wojewódzkiego Ośrodka Kultury w Bydgoszczy. pp. 35–41.
- Brakowski, Konrad (1973). Wczoraj, dziś i jutro Żeglugi Bydgoskiej. Kalendarz Bydgoski (in Polish). Bydgoszcz: Towarzystwo Miłośników Miasta Bydgoszczy. pp. 124–131.
- Bręczewska-Kulesza, Daria (2004). Bydgoszcz w stronę Okola (in Polish). Bydgoszcz: Zakład Poligraficzny Kordruk - Bogdan Koronka.
- Hojka, Zdzisław (2003). Kanał Bydgoski bis. Kalendarz Bydgoski (in Polish). Bydgoszcz: Towarzystwo Miłośników Miasta Bydgoszczy.
- Jeleniewski, Marek K. (2008). Z biegiem lat z biegiem Brdy, Bydgoszcz 2002; Rola Kanału Bydgoskiego w powstaniu i rozwoju Bydgoszczy. Rewitalizacja drogi wodnej Wisła – Odra szansą dla gospodarki regionu (in Polish). Bydgoszcz.
- Kocerka, Henryk (2004). Historia toru regatowego w Brdyujściu 1912-2004. Kronika Bydgoska XXVI (in Polish). Bydgoszcz: Towarzystwo Miłośników Miasta Bydgoszczy. pp. 317–326.
- Mrozek, Zdzisław (1995). Przez śluzy Kanału Bydgoskiego. Kalendarz Bydgoski (in Polish). Bydgoszcz: Towarzystwo Miłośników Miasta Bydgoszczy. pp. 186–191.
- Płyń barko po rzekach i kanałach. Kalendarz Bydgoski (in Polish). Bydgoszcz: Towarzystwo Miłośników Miasta Bydgoszczy. 2003.
- bek (1972). Pożegnanie ze Starym Kanałem. Kalendarz Bydgoski (in Polish). Bydgoszcz: Towarzystwo Miłośników Miasta Bydgoszczy. pp. 39–43.
- Szcząchor, Arleta (2004). Tradycje Żeglugi Bydgoskiej – Lloyd Bydgoski 1891-1945. Kronika Bydgoska XXV (in Polish). Bydgoszcz: Towarzystwo Miłośników Miasta Bydgoszczy. pp. 76–103.
- Turowski, Stefan (1988). Żegluga śródlądowa w Bydgoszczy w latach 1945-82. Kronika Bydgoska IX (in Polish). Bydgoszcz: Towarzystwo Miłośników Miasta Bydgoszczy. pp. 127–146.
- Wilder, Jan Antoni (1936). "Polski projekt Kanału Bydgoskiego. Przegląd Bydgoski Rocznik 1 R. 1936 z. 1-2". Biblioteka Uniwersytetu Kazimierza Wielkiego W Bydgoszczy (in Polish). Bydgoszcz: Biblioteka miejska: 3–20.
- Winid, Walenty (1928). Kanał Bydgoski (in Polish). Warszawa: Wydawnictwo Instytutu Popierania Nauki.
- Woźniak-Hlebionek, Agnieszka (2001). Kanał Bydgoski, Brda i Noteć w pruskich planach inwestycyjnych w latach 1773-1915. Kronika Bydgoska XXIII (in Polish). Bydgoszcz: Towarzystwo Miłośników Miasta Bydgoszczy. pp. 135–144.
- Wroński Stanisław, Pietrzak Ewa (2008). Wodna szansa dla Bydgoszczy. Kalendarz Bydgoski (in Polish). Bydgoszcz: Towarzystwo Miłośników Miasta Bydgoszczy.
