= Osowa Góra (Bydgoszcz district) =

District in Bydgoszcz

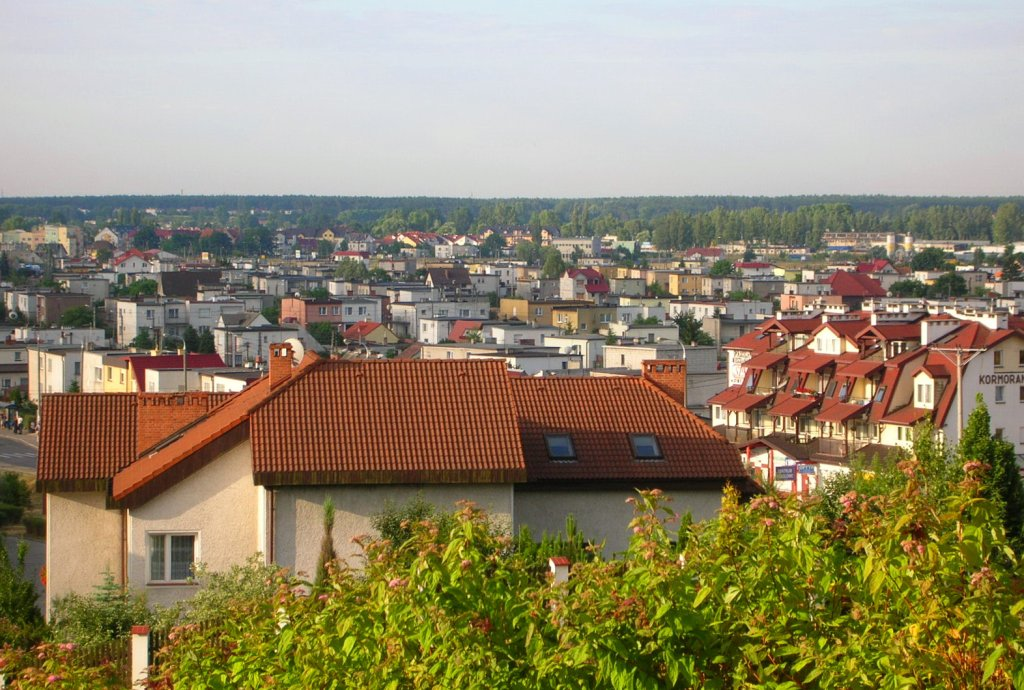
The bottom part of Osowa Góra

Osowa Góra, a district in the western part of Bydgoszcz, at the northern part of Bydgoszcz Canal. It has about 14,000 residents. It was incorporated into Bydgoszcz in 1959.

== Buildings & Places ==
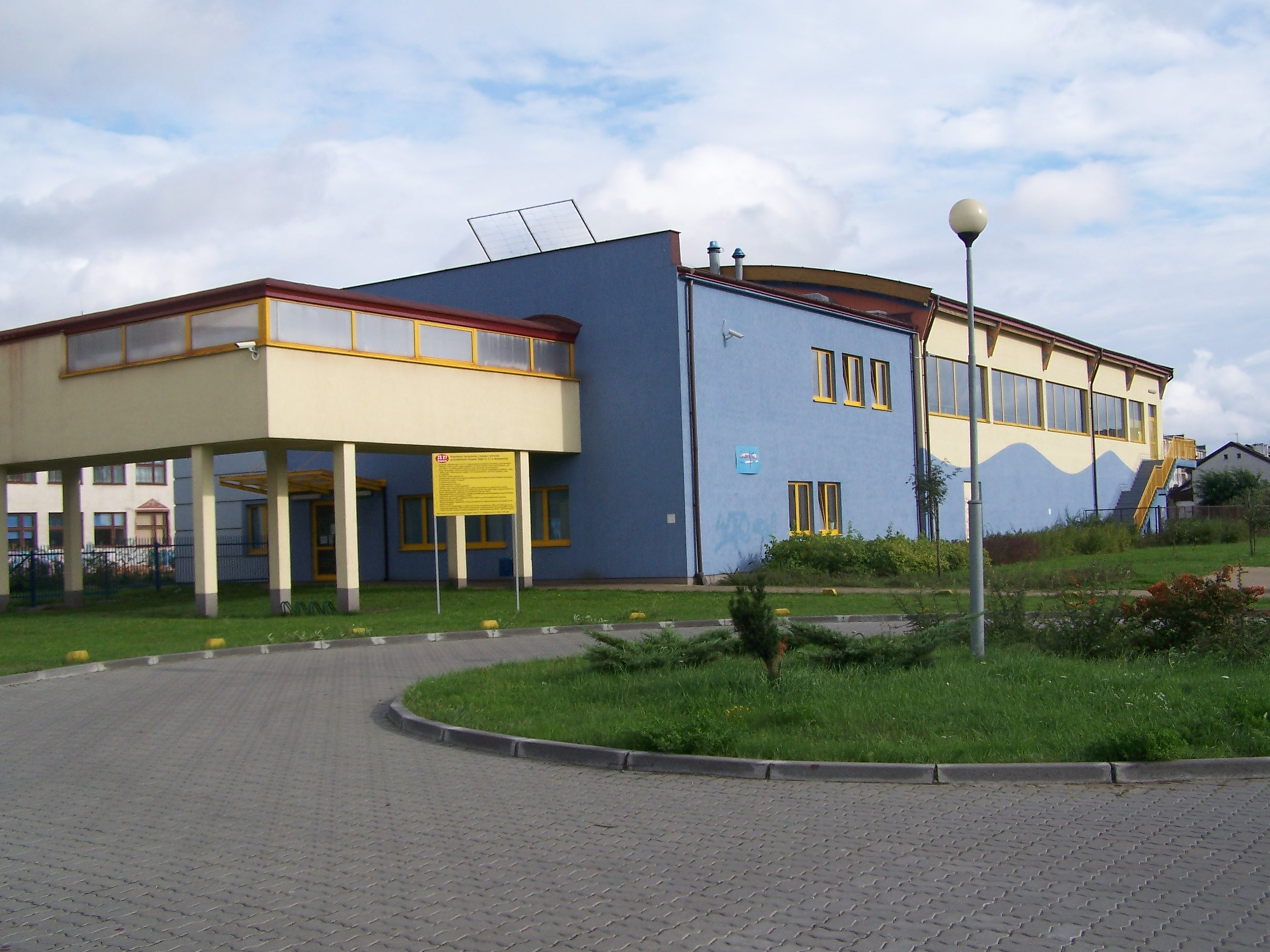
Sardine Pool

- Saint Maximilian Kolbe Church
- Ascension of Jesus Church
- Pool "Sardynka" (Sardine)
- Animal Shelter

== Education ==
Primary Schools

- Marian Rejewski 40th Primary School
- 650th Bydgoszcz's Birthday 64th Primary School (Polish: Szkoła Podstawowa Nr 64 im. 650-lecia Miasta Bydgoszczy)

== See also ==
- Bydgoszcz
