= Flisy (Bydgoszcz district) =

District in Bydgoszcz, Poland

Coordinates: 53.1394°N 17.9338°E

Flisy is a district in Bydgoszcz, Poland, west of the city, above the Bydgoszcz Canal.
