= Rybkowo =

- Settlement
- Location within Poland
- Coordinates: 53°24′33″N 17°47′29″E
- Country: Poland
- Voivodeship: Kuyavian-Pomeranian
- County: Bydgoszcz
- Gmina: Koronowo
- Zip Code: 86-013
- Vehicle registration: CBY

Rybkowo is a settlement in the administrative district of Gmina Koronowo, within Bydgoszcz County, Kuyavian-Pomeranian Voivodeship, in north-central Poland. The town is at the intersection of National Road No. 25 and Provincial Road No. 237, and is also located in the currently suspended Tuchola-Koronowo railway line. It was formerly a collective farm, and until 1954, the town was the seat of the Makowarsko commune.
