= Lasko =

Lasko may refer to:

== Places ==
- Laško, a town in Slovenia
- Łasko, a village in West Pomeranian Voivodeship, Poland
- Łąsko, two villages in Kuyavian-Pomeranian Voivodeship, Poland
  - Łąsko Małe
  - Łąsko Wielkie

== People ==
- Lasko Andonovski (born 1991), Macedonian handball player
- Lech Łasko (born 1956), Polish volleyball player
- Léo Lasko (1885–1949), German screenwriter and film director
- Michał Łasko (born 1981), Italian volleyball player
- Miss Lasko-Gross (born 1977), American comics creator
- Peter Lasko (1924–2003), British art historian

== Other uses ==
- Laško subdialect of Slovenian
- Lasko – Die Faust Gottes, a German television series
- Laško Brewery, Slovenian brewing company
- Lasko a fan company.

== See also ==
- Lakso
- Lasco
