= Samociążek =

- Village
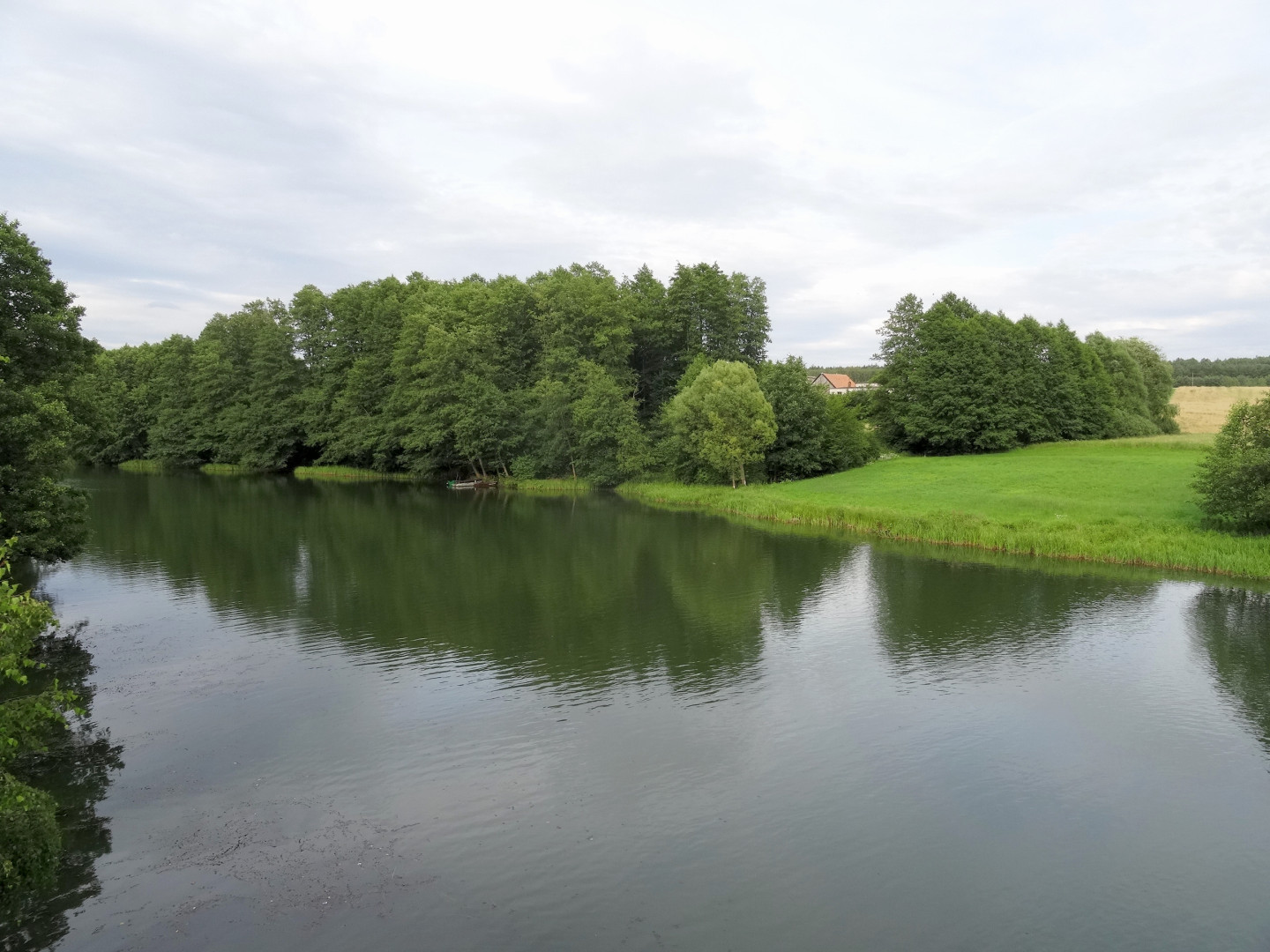
- Brda River in Samociążek

- Location within Poland
- Coordinates: 53°17′N 17°58′E
- Country: Poland
- Voivodeship: Kuyavian-Pomeranian
- County: Bydgoszcz
- Gmina: Koronowo
- Population: 320
- Time zone: UTC+1 (CET)
  - Summer (DST): UTC+2 (CEST)
- Vehicle registration: CBY

Samociążek [samɔˈt͡ɕɔ̃ʐɛk] is a village in the administrative district of Gmina Koronowo, within Bydgoszcz County, Kuyavian-Pomeranian Voivodeship, in north-central Poland. It is located in the historic region of Kuyavia.

During the German occupation (World War II), sołtys of Samociążek (head of local administration) Bernard Ziołkowski was among Poles massacred by the Germans on October 5–6, 1939 in the forest near Buszkowo as part of the Intelligenzaktion.
