= Lasco =

Lasco or LASCO may refer to:

- Lasco, California, United States
- Lasco Jamaica, a food, financial, household and personal care and pharmaceutical company based in Kingston, Jamaica
- Laboratory for the Analysis of Organisational Communication Systems, in Louvain-la-Neuve in Belgium
- Large Angle and Spectrometric Coronagraph, an instrument on the Solar and Heliospheric Observatory satellite (SOHO)
- Larkin Aircraft Supply Company, an Australian aircraft manufacturer
- John a Lasco (1499–1560), Polish Protestant evangelical reformer

== See also ==
- Lascaux
- Lasko (disambiguation)
