= Wierzchucin Królewski =

- Village
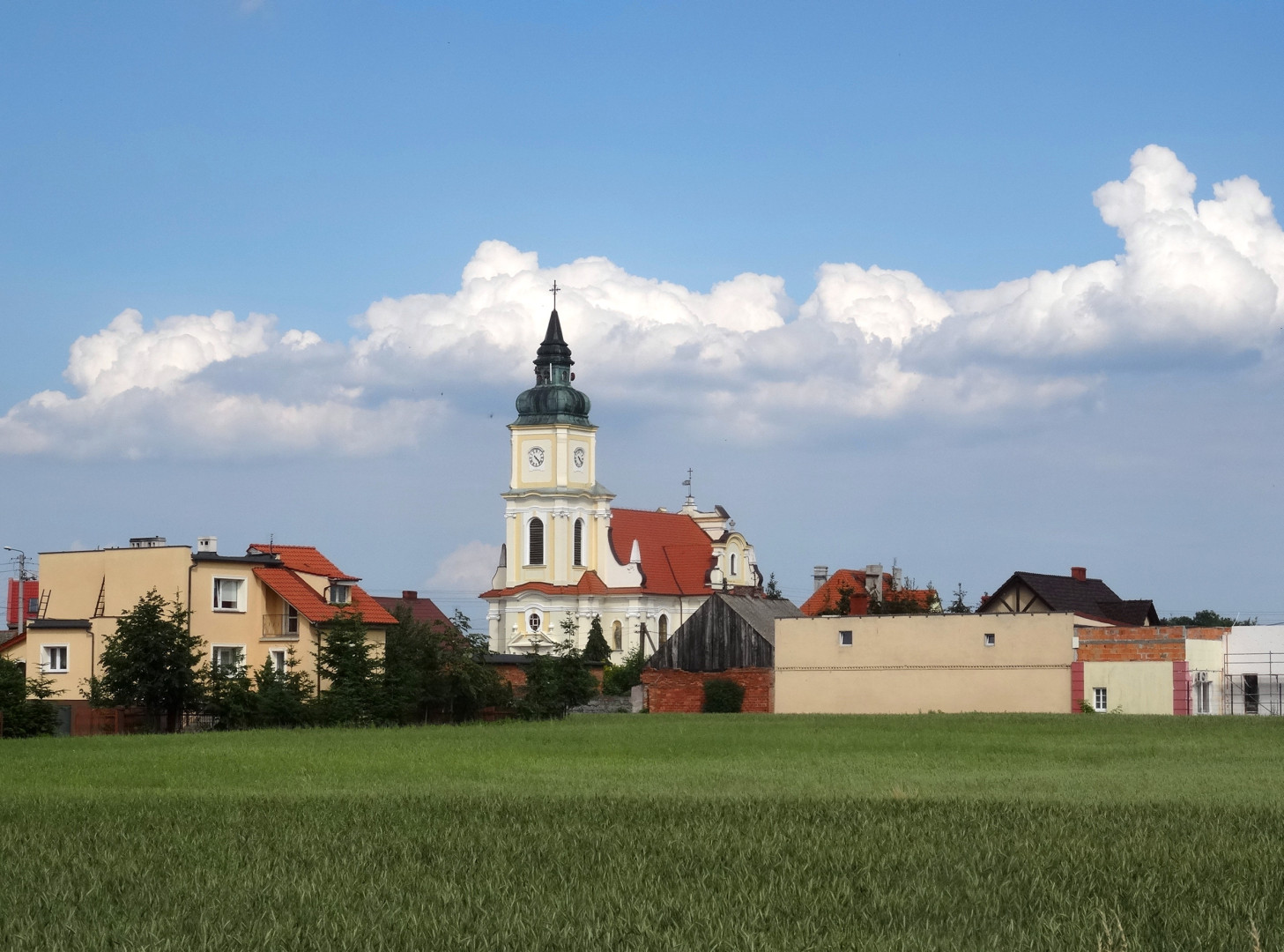
- Church of Saints Peter and Paul

- Location within Poland
- Coordinates: 53°18′N 17°47′E
- Country: Poland
- Voivodeship: Kuyavian-Pomeranian
- County: Bydgoszcz
- Gmina: Koronowo

Wierzchucin Królewski (Polish pronunciation: [vjɛʂˈxutɕiŋ kruˈlɛfskʲi]) is a village in the administrative district of Gmina Koronowo, within Bydgoszcz County, Kuyavian-Pomeranian Voivodeship, in north-central Poland.
