= Huta, Bydgoszcz County =

Huta
- Village
- Location within Poland
- Coordinates: 53°20′N 17°41′E
- Country: Poland
- Voivodeship: Kuyavian-Pomeranian
- County: Bydgoszcz
- Gmina: Koronowo
- Population: 200
- Website: http://miejscowosc.huta.eu

Huta [ˈxuta] is a village in the administrative district of Gmina Koronowo, within Bydgoszcz County, Kuyavian-Pomeranian Voivodeship, in north-central Poland.
