= Iwickowo =

- Village
- Location within Poland
- Coordinates: 53°19′29″N 17°56′0″E
- Country: Poland
- Voivodeship: Kuyavian-Pomeranian
- County: Bydgoszcz
- Gmina: Koronowo

Iwickowo [ivit͡sˈkɔvɔ] is a village in the administrative district of Gmina Koronowo, within Bydgoszcz County, Kuyavian-Pomeranian Voivodeship, in north-central Poland.
