= Okole, Kuyavian-Pomeranian Voivodeship =

Okole
- Village
- Location within Poland
- Coordinates: 53°18′N 17°57′E
- Country: Poland
- Voivodeship: Kuyavian-Pomeranian
- County: Bydgoszcz
- Gmina: Koronowo
- Population: 78

Okole [ɔˈkɔlɛ] is a village in the administrative district of Gmina Koronowo, within Bydgoszcz County, Kuyavian-Pomeranian Voivodeship, in north-central Poland.
