= Morzewiec =

- Village
- Location within Poland
- Coordinates: 53°13′35″N 17°54′7″E
- Country: Poland
- Voivodeship: Kuyavian-Pomeranian
- County: Bydgoszcz
- Gmina: Koronowo
- Population: 130

Morzewiec [mɔˈʐɛvjɛt͡s] is a village in the administrative district of Gmina Koronowo, within Bydgoszcz County, Kuyavian-Pomeranian Voivodeship, in north-central Poland.
