= Wilcze, Kuyavian-Pomeranian Voivodeship =

Wilcze
- Village
- Location within Poland
- Coordinates: 53°22′N 17°48′E
- Country: Poland
- Voivodeship: Kuyavian-Pomeranian
- County: Bydgoszcz
- Gmina: Koronowo
- Time zone: UTC+1 (CET)
  - Summer (DST): UTC+2 (CEST)
- Vehicle registration: CBY

Wilcze [ˈvilt͡ʂɛ] is a village in the administrative district of Gmina Koronowo, within Bydgoszcz County, Kuyavian-Pomeranian Voivodeship, in north-central Poland.

== History ==
During the German occupation of Poland (World War II), in 1941, the occupiers carried out expulsions of Poles, who were deported to the Potulice concentration camp, while their farms were then handed over to German colonists as part of the Lebensraum policy.
