= Lipinki =

Lipinki may refer to:

- Lipinki, Bydgoszcz County in Kuyavian-Pomeranian Voivodeship (north-central Poland)
- Lipinki, Świecie County in Kuyavian-Pomeranian Voivodeship (north-central Poland)
- Lipinki, Gmina Sosnówka, Biała County in Lublin Voivodeship (east Poland)
- Lipinki, Chełm County in Lublin Voivodeship (east Poland)
- Lipinki, Lesser Poland Voivodeship (south Poland)
- Lipinki, Kozienice County in Masovian Voivodeship (east-central Poland)
- Lipinki, Wołomin County in Masovian Voivodeship (east-central Poland)
- Lipinki, Lubusz Voivodeship (west Poland)
- Lipinki, Warmian-Masurian Voivodeship (north Poland)
- Lipinki, West Pomeranian Voivodeship (north-west Poland)
- Lipinki Łużyckie (west Poland)
- Lipinki Szlacheckie (north Poland)
