= Dąbrowice =

Dąbrowice may refer to the following places:

- Dąbrowice, Bydgoszcz County in Kuyavian-Pomeranian Voivodeship (north-central Poland)
- Dąbrowice, Nakło County in Kuyavian-Pomeranian Voivodeship (north-central Poland)
- Dąbrowice, Kutno County in Łódź Voivodeship (central Poland)
- Dąbrowice, Gmina Maków in Łódź Voivodeship (central Poland)
- Dąbrowice, Gmina Skierniewice in Łódź Voivodeship (central Poland)
- Dąbrowice, Masovian Voivodeship (north-central Poland)
- Dąbrowice, Greater Poland Voivodeship (central Poland)
- Dąbrowice, Opole Voivodeship (southern Poland)
