= Battle of Koronowo =

1410 battle in Europe

- Part of the Polish–Lithuanian–Teutonic War
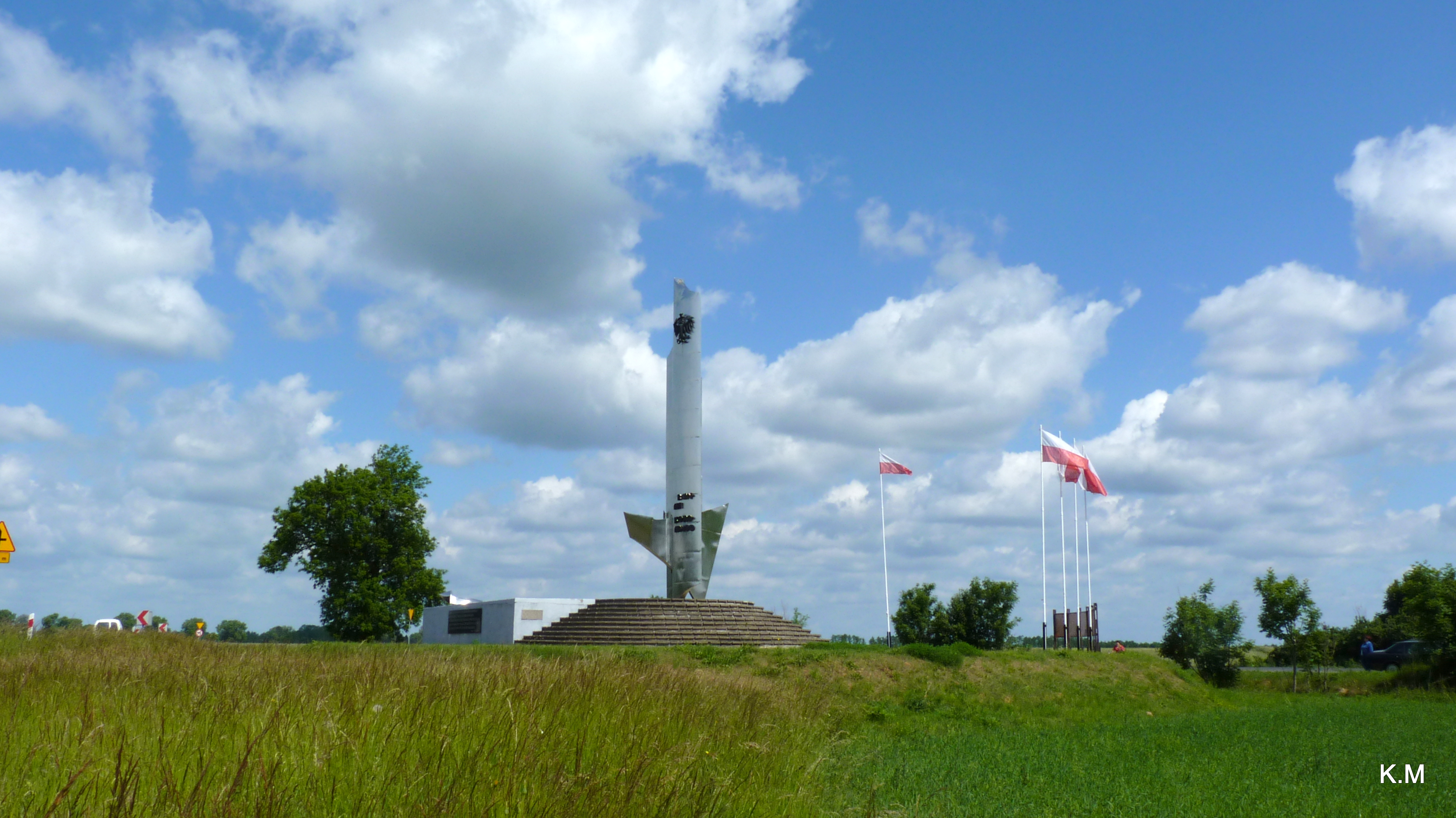
- Monument to the Battle of Koronowo
Date	10 October 1410
Location	Near Koronowo, Poland 53°21′25″N 17°48′40″E
Result	Polish victory

Belligerents
Kingdom of Poland	Teutonic Order; Czech mercenaries; Silesian mercenaries

Commanders and leaders
King Władysław II Jagiełło; Sędziwój Ostroróg; Piotr Niedźwiedzki	Michael Küchmeister von Sternberg (POW)

Strength
2,000 men	Unknown amount of Teutonic Knights; 3,000 Czech and Silesian mercenaries

Casualties and losses
Unknown, but few	800–1,000 killed (est.); 300–500 captured (est.)
- Location within Poland

The Battle of Koronowo was a battle of the Polish–Lithuanian–Teutonic War. It took place on 10 October 1410, near the village of Łąsko Wielkie and ended in victory for the Polish–Lithuanian alliance.

This is the account of the battle of Jan Długosz, from the abridged translation by Maurice Michael, pp. 399–401:

The Order's troops hasten back to their horses and start to withdraw. Their idea is that, if the Poles, who are on foot, get far enough from the town, the rest of the garrison will be unable to come to their assistance should fighting start. However, the Polish archers fire flight after flight of arrows at the withdrawing Knights which wound many of them and allow the Poles to get in among them and kill many more. Every time the enemy turns to attack the archers, these withdraw in among their own knights, where they are safe, and from where they emerge later and start shooting again. This skirmish continues for over a mile, until the enemy reaches a village, Laczko, belonging to the monastery at Koronowo. Here they reform and await the Poles' attack, confident that the terrain will give them an advantage. However, instead of advancing straight at them, the Poles make a detour to the steeper side of the hill. The men of both armies are well experienced in the art of war, men who will fight with the greatest courage. However, before the two sides actually engage, Conrad of Niemcza, a Silesian [German, more or less] in King Sigismund's army, on his own initiative rides out and challenges the Poles to a duel.

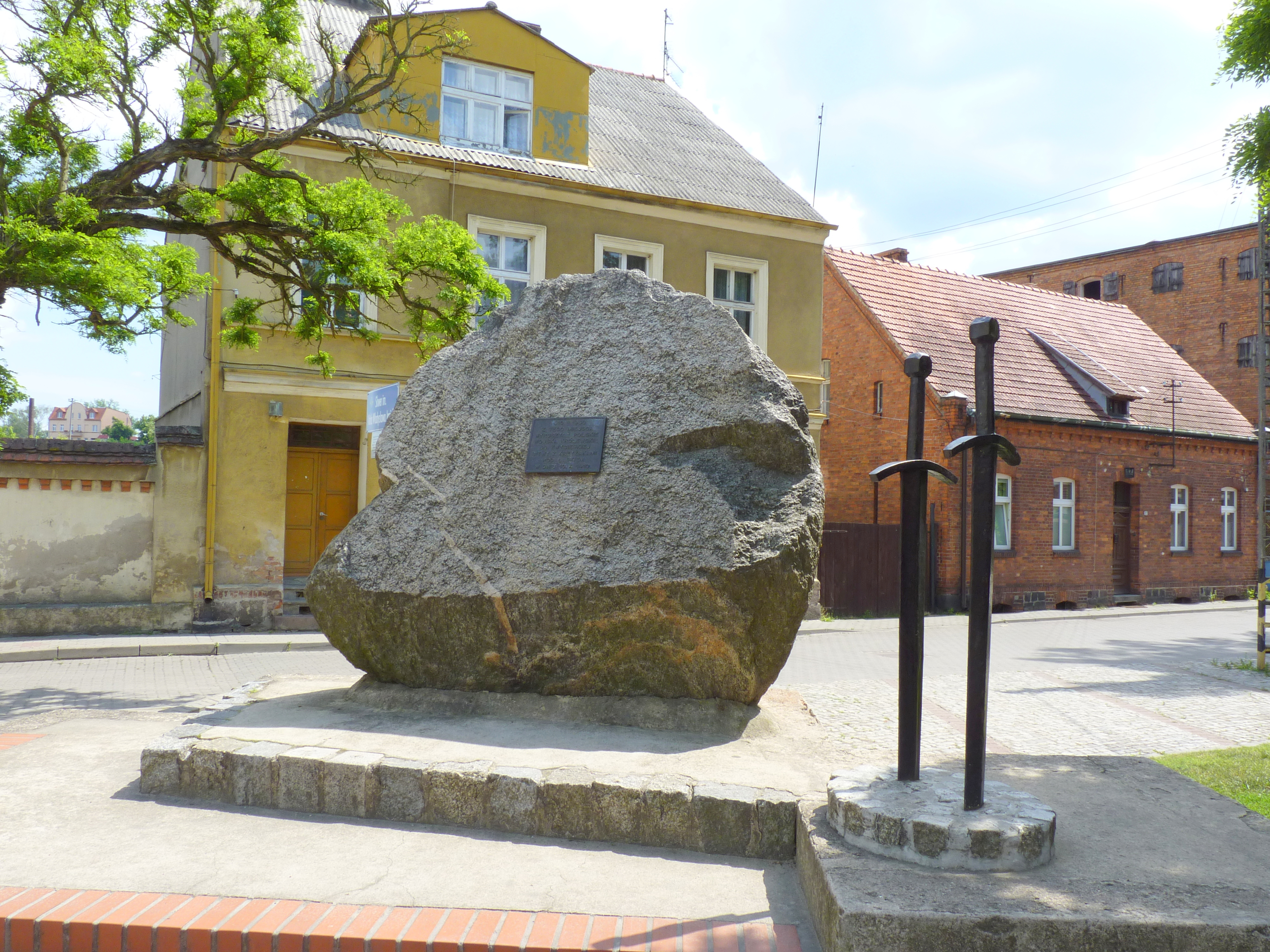
Monument in Koronowo at the place from which the Polish army set out for the battle

The challenge is taken up by Jan Szczycki, who unseats the challenger and tramples him. The two ranks then close with great shouts. Each stands firm and the outcome is long uncertain, for the two sides are equal in armament, skill and experience; but eventually they become exhausted and fighting stops, as if a truce had been agreed. One is then arranged, and for a short period the ranks separate, wipe away their sweat, and rest. After a while, the truce is declared at an end and fighting resumes. Many are killed or taken prisoner. When exhaustion again overcomes them without Fortune having given any indication of where the advantage lies, a fresh truce is arranged, during which the knights rub down their horses and themselves, bandage wounds, rest, talk, exchange prisoners and captured horses, send each other wine and clear up the ground of the wounded and those thrown from their horses and unable to get up, lest these be trampled when the fighting resumes; indeed, the scene is such that all of them might have been thought the greatest friends, instead of enemies.

Fighting then starts up for a third time. None can remember so bitter a struggle between two armies of veterans experienced in the profession of arms, who fight on until wounded or taken prisoner. Still the fight is equal, each side fighting under a single standard, that of the Poles a dark-red dual cross stitched to a white background, that of the Teutonic Knights a white and red field joined diagonally, which is borne by Henry a knight of French origin. Suddenly, a Polish knight, Jan Naszan, knocks the enemy's standard-bearer from his horse, seizes the standard, rolls it up and fastens it to his saddle. At once the Poles begin to have the advantage and, the enemy begins to think of retreat. Then as fear begins to outweigh shame, the enemy starts to withdraw and so their defeat becomes a certainty. Many are killed or taken prisoner; the others forced to flee, pursued by their victors as long as these have the strength to run and kill. Then nightfall hides the fugitives.

Later, the family of the knight who lost the Knights' standard reproaches him for its loss; and he would, indeed, have been accounted dishonoured, had not King Wladislaw, at the man's own request, given him a letter absolving him of the shame. Experts in the art of war consider this battle more important than that fought at Grunwald; and if you consider the danger, ardour and endurance of the combatants, it certainly should rank higher."
