= Gmina Koronowo =

Gmina Koronowo Koronowo Commune
- Gmina
- Flag Coat of arms

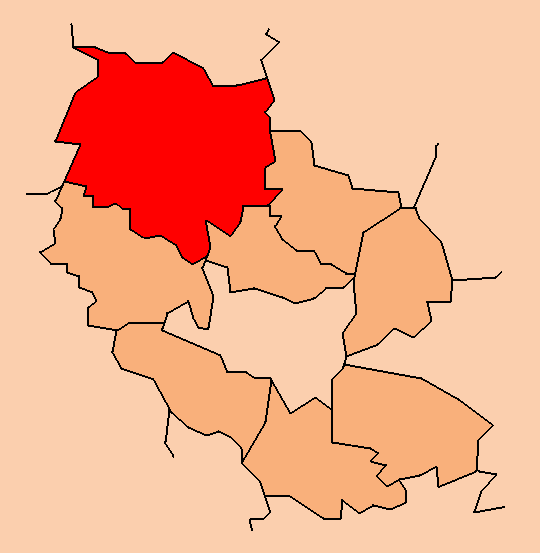
- Location within the county
- Coordinates (Koronowo): 53°19′0″N 17°56′0″E
- Country: Poland
- Voivodeship: Kuyavian-Pomeranian
- County: Bydgoszcz County
- Seat: Koronowo

Area
  - Total: 411.7 km^{2} (159.0 sq mi)

Population (2006)
  - Total: 23,229
  - Density: 56.42/km^{2} (146.1/sq mi)
  - Urban: 10,784
  - Rural: 12,445
- Website: http://www.koronowo.pl/

Gmina Koronowo is an urban-rural gmina (administrative district) in Bydgoszcz County, Kuyavian-Pomeranian Voivodeship, in north-central Poland. Its seat is the town of Koronowo, which lies approximately 23 kilometres (14 mi) north of Bydgoszcz.

The gmina covers an area of 411.7 square kilometres (159.0 sq mi), and as of 2006 its total population is 23,229 (of which the population of Koronowo amounts to 10,784, and the population of the rural part of the gmina is 12,445).

== Villages ==
Apart from the town of Koronowo, Gmina Koronowo contains the villages and settlements of Aleksandrowiec, Bieskowo, Buszkowo, Byszewo, Bytkowice, Dąbrowice, Dziedzinek, Glinki, Gogolin, Gogolinek, Gościeradz, Huta, Iwickowo, Krąpiewo, Łakomowo, Łąsko Małe, Łąsko Wielkie, Lipinki, Lucim, Mąkowarsko, Mąkowarsko PGR, Młynkowiec, Morzewiec, Nowy Dwór, Nowy Jasiniec, Okole, Osiek, Popielewo, Romanowo, Różanna, Salno, Samociążek, Sitowiec, Skarbiewo, Sokole-Kuźnica, Srebrnica, Stary Dwór, Stopka, Tryszczyn, Tryszczyn-Elektrownia, Tuszyny, Wierzchucin Królewski, Więzowno, Wilcza Góra, Wilcze, Wiskitno, Witoldowo and Wtelno.

== Neighbouring gminas ==
Gmina Koronowo is bordered by the gminas of Dobrcz, Gostycyn, Lubiewo, Osielsko, Pruszcz, Sicienko, Sośno and Świekatowo.
