= Lucim =

- Village
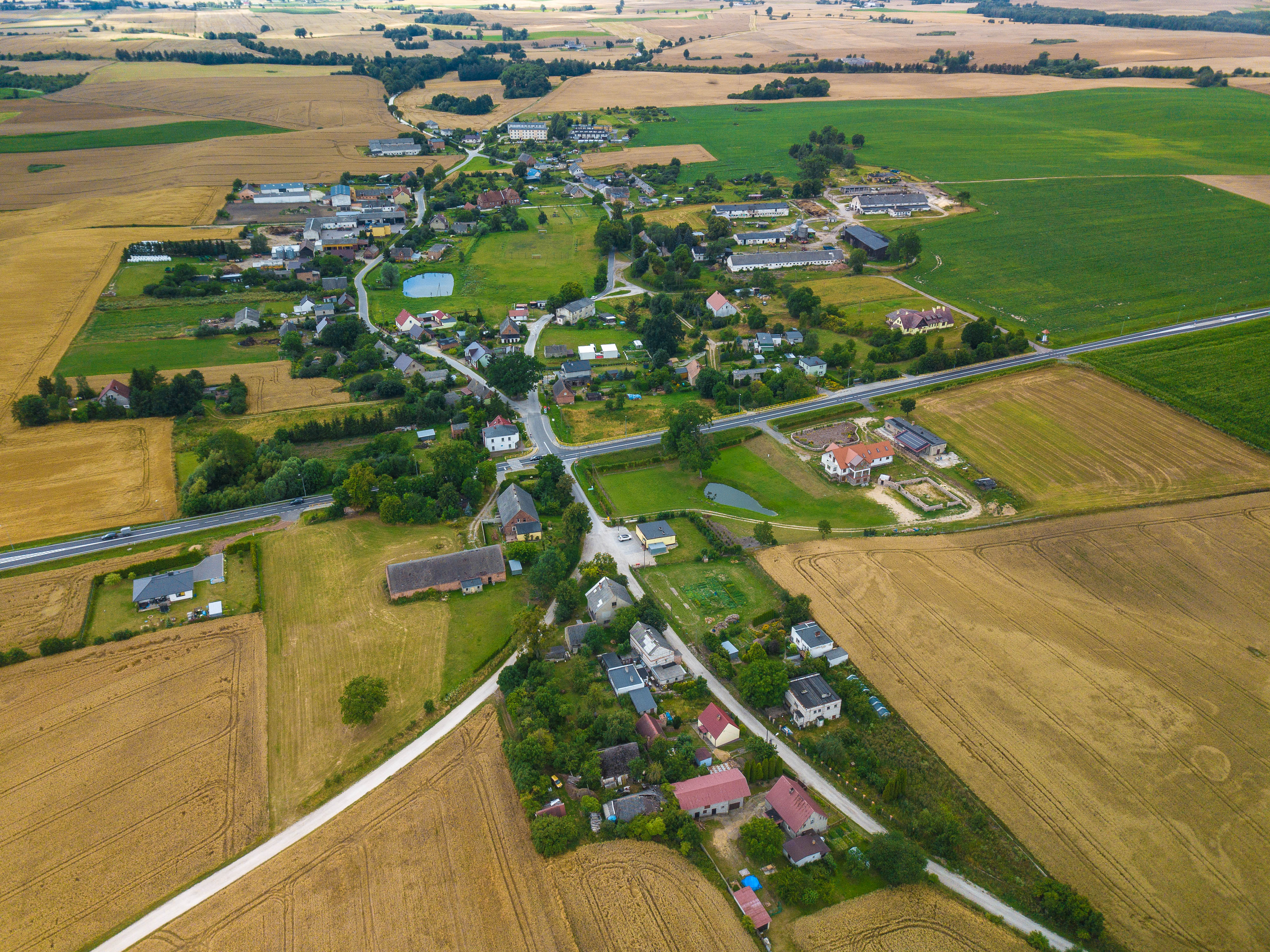

- Location within Poland
- Coordinates: 53°23′N 17°50′E
- Country: Poland
- Voivodeship: Kuyavian-Pomeranian
- County: Bydgoszcz
- Gmina: Koronowo
- Population: 665
- Time zone: UTC+1 (CET)
  - Summer (DST): UTC+2 (CEST)
- Vehicle registration: CBY
- Website: https://web.archive.org/web/20070927222428/http://www.lucim.org/

Lucim [ˈlut͡ɕim] is a village in the administrative district of Gmina Koronowo, within Bydgoszcz County, Kuyavian-Pomeranian Voivodeship, in north-central Poland. It is located in the region of Krajna.

== History ==
Lucim was a private church village administratively located in the Nakło County in the Kalisz Voivodeship in the Greater Poland Province of the Kingdom of Poland.

During the German occupation of Poland (World War II), inhabitants of Lucim were among the victims of a massacre of Poles committed by the German Selbstschutz in nearby Jastrzębie in January 1940.
