= Sokole-Kuźnica, Gmina Koronowo =

Sokole-Kuźnica
- Village
- Location within Poland
- Coordinates: 53°25′N 17°57′E
- Country: Poland
- Voivodeship: Kuyavian-Pomeranian
- County: Bydgoszcz
- Gmina: Koronowo

Sokole-Kuźnica (Polish: [sɔˈkɔlɛ kuʑˈɲit͡sa]) is a village in the administrative district of Gmina Koronowo, within Bydgoszcz County, Kuyavian-Pomeranian Voivodeship, in north-central Poland.
