= Wiskitno =

- Village
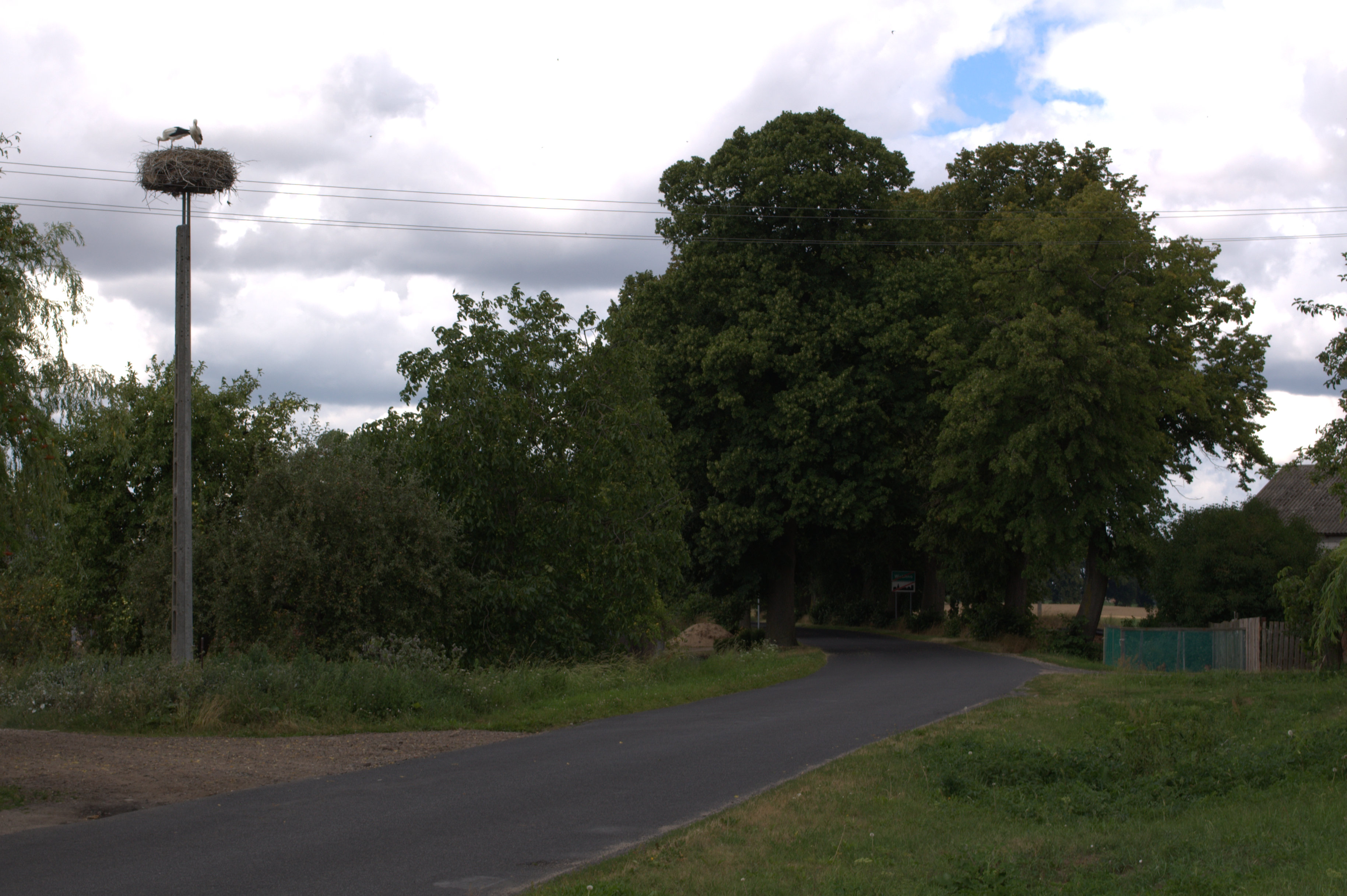

- Location within Poland
- Coordinates: 53°20′N 17°46′E
- Country: Poland
- Voivodeship: Kuyavian-Pomeranian
- County: Bydgoszcz
- Gmina: Koronowo
- Time zone: UTC+1 (CET)
  - Summer (DST): UTC+2 (CEST)
- Vehicle registration: CBY

Wiskitno [visˈkitnɔ] is a village in the administrative district of Gmina Koronowo, within Bydgoszcz County, Kuyavian-Pomeranian Voivodeship, in north-central Poland.

== History ==
During the German occupation of Poland (World War II), in 1941, the occupiers carried out expulsions of Poles, who were deported either to a transit camp in Toruń or to the Potulice concentration camp. Houses and farms of expelled Poles were handed over to German colonists as part of the Lebensraum policy.
