= Aleksandrowiec, Gmina Koronowo =

Aleksandrowiec
- Village
- Location within Poland
- Coordinates: 53°17′59″N 18°3′2″E
- Country: Poland
- Voivodeship: Kuyavian-Pomeranian
- County: Bydgoszcz
- Gmina: Koronowo

Aleksandrowiec [alɛksanˈdrɔvjɛt͡s] is a village in the administrative district of Gmina Koronowo, within Bydgoszcz County, Kuyavian-Pomeranian Voivodeship, in north-central Poland.
