= Wilcza Góra =

Wilcza Góra may refer to the following places:

- Wilcza Góra, Kuyavian-Pomeranian Voivodeship (north-central Poland)
- Wilcza Góra, Masovian Voivodeship (east-central Poland)
- Wilcza Góra, Silesian Voivodeship (south Poland)
