= Skarbiewo =

- Village
- Location within Poland
- Coordinates: 53°20′N 17°52′E
- Country: Poland
- Voivodeship: Kuyavian-Pomeranian
- County: Bydgoszcz
- Gmina: Koronowo
- Time zone: UTC+1 (CET)
  - Summer (DST): UTC+2 (CEST)
- Vehicle registration: CBY

Skarbiewo [skarˈbjɛvɔ] is a village, in the administrative district of Gmina Koronowo, within Bydgoszcz County, Kuyavian-Pomeranian Voivodeship, in north-central Poland.

== History ==
During the German occupation of Poland (World War II), in 1941, the occupiers carried out expulsions of Poles, whose farms were then handed over to German colonists as part of the Lebensraum policy. Expelled Poles were placed in a transit camp in Toruń, and then deported either to the Warsaw District of the General Government in German-occupied central Poland or to forced labour in Germany.
