= Srebrnica, Kuyavian-Pomeranian Voivodeship =

Srebrnica
- Village
- Location within Poland
- Coordinates: 53°20′48″N 17°56′18″E
- Country: Poland
- Voivodeship: Kuyavian-Pomeranian
- County: Bydgoszcz
- Gmina: Koronowo

Srebrnica ([srɛbrˈnit͡sa]) is a village in the administrative district of Gmina Koronowo, within Bydgoszcz County, Kuyavian-Pomeranian Voivodeship, in north-central Poland.
