= Nowy Jasiniec =

- Village
- Location within Poland
- Coordinates: 53°21′N 18°2′E
- Country: Poland
- Voivodeship: Kuyavian-Pomeranian
- County: Bydgoszcz
- Gmina: Koronowo
- Population: 210

Nowy Jasiniec [ˈnɔvɨ jaˈɕiɲɛt͡s] is a village in the administrative district of Gmina Koronowo, within Bydgoszcz County, Kuyavian-Pomeranian Voivodeship, in north-central Poland.

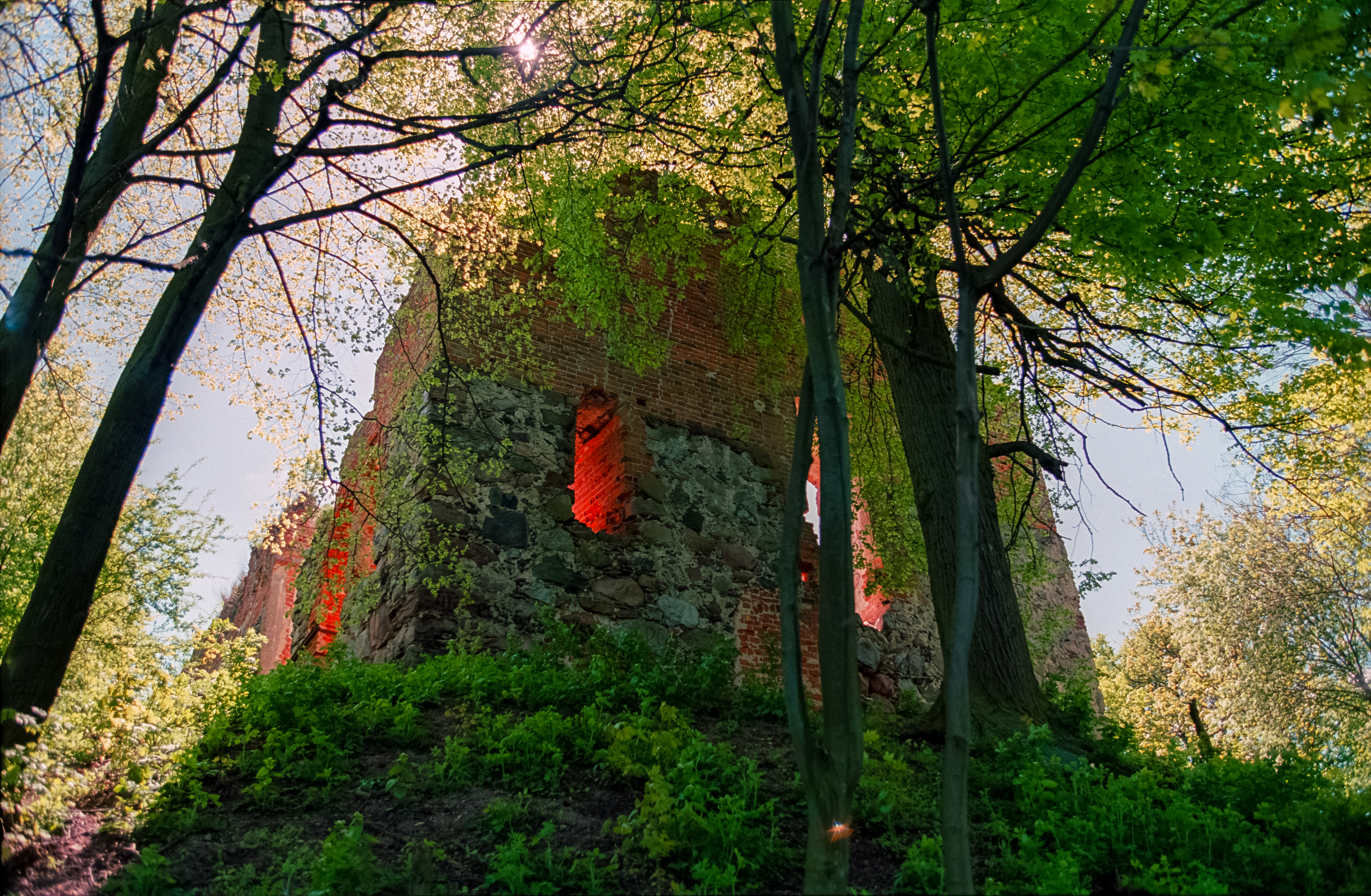
Nowy Jasiniec Castle

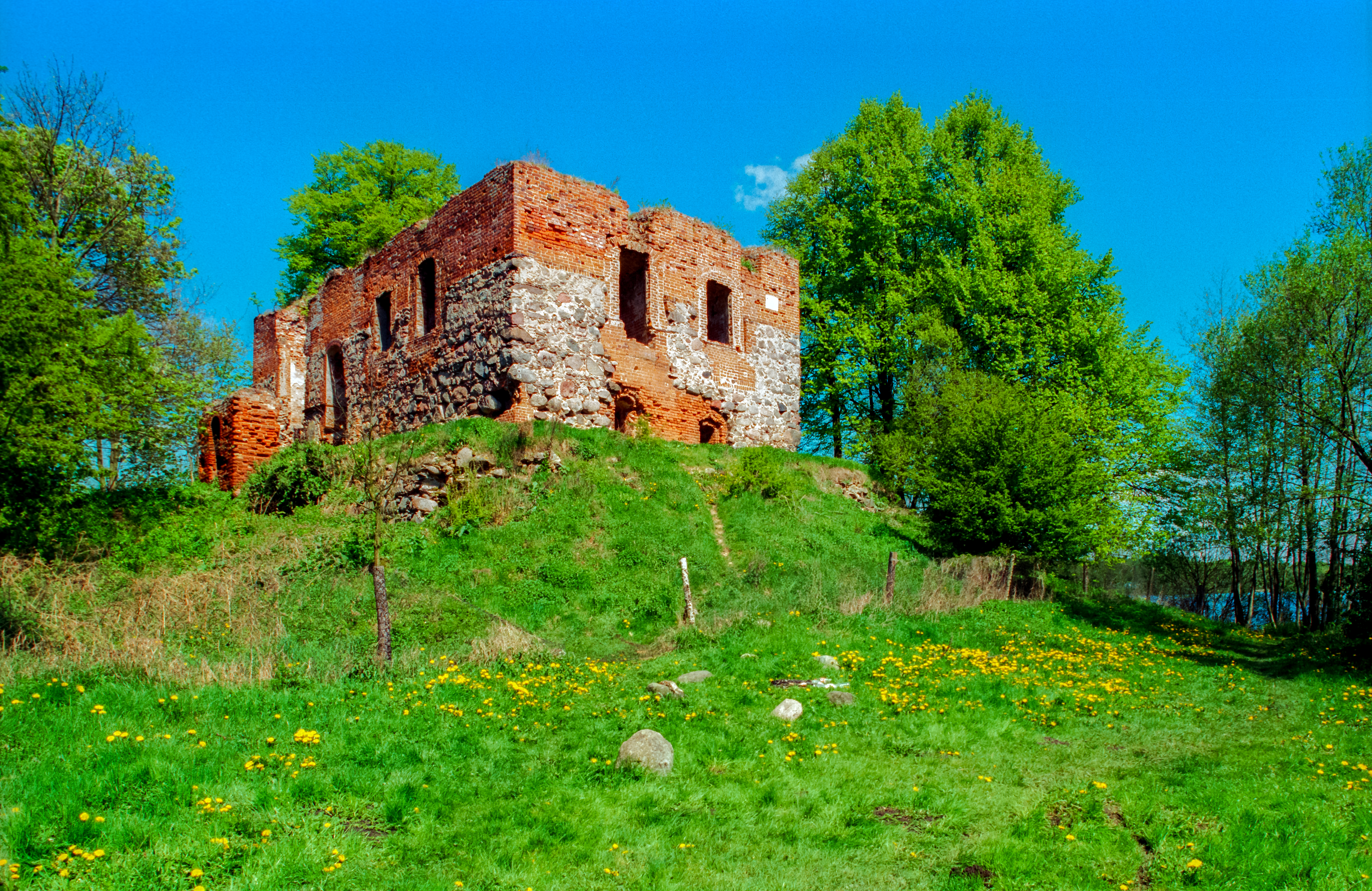
Nowy Jasiniec Castle

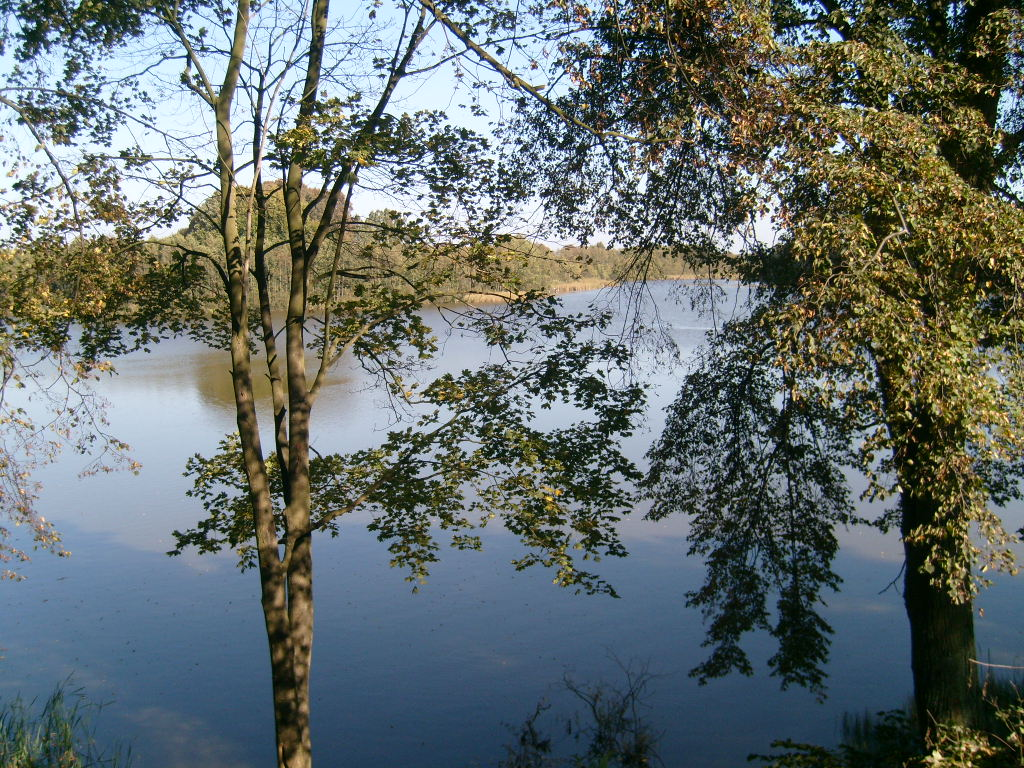
Castle lake
