= Tryszczyn-Elektrownia =

- Village
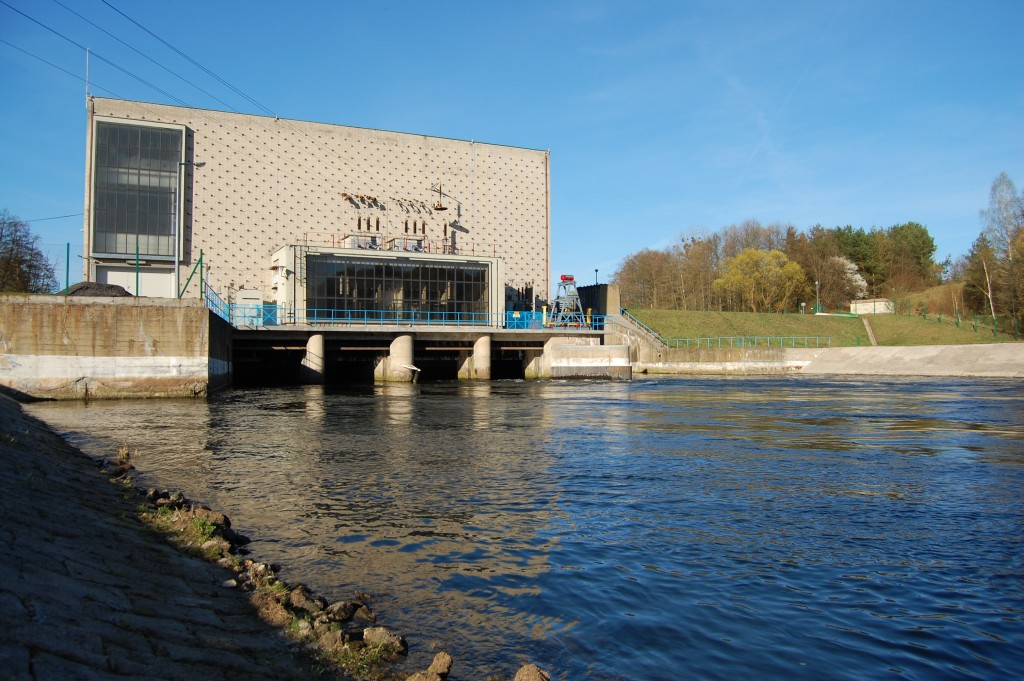

- Location within Poland
- Coordinates: 53°13′36″N 17°56′44″E
- Country: Poland
- Voivodeship: Kuyavian-Pomeranian
- County: Bydgoszcz
- Gmina: Koronowo

Tryszczyn-Elektrownia [ˈtrɨʂt͡ʂɨn ɛlɛkˈtrɔvɲa] is part of the village of Tryszczyn in the administrative district of Gmina Koronowo, within Bydgoszcz County, Kuyavian-Pomeranian Voivodeship, in north-central Poland.
