= Bieskowo =

- Village
- Location within Poland
- Coordinates: 53°17′42″N 17°53′02″E
- Country: Poland
- Voivodeship: Kuyavian-Pomeranian
- County: Bydgoszcz
- Gmina: Koronowo
- Population: 154

Bieskowo [bjɛsˈkɔvɔ] is a village in the administrative district of Gmina Koronowo, within Bydgoszcz County, Kuyavian-Pomeranian Voivodeship, in north-central Poland.
