= Koronowo =

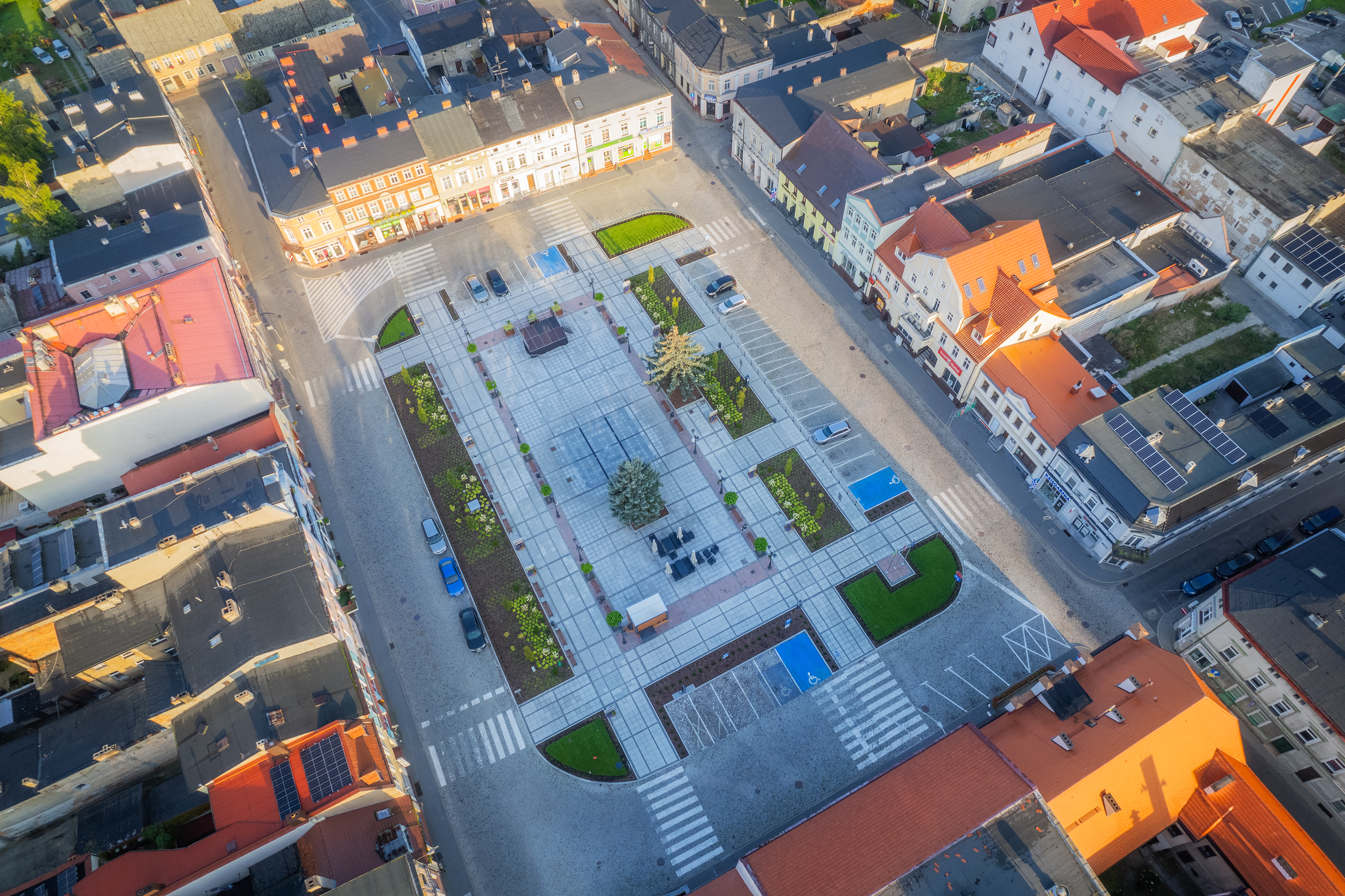
- Town square

- Flag Coat of arms

- Location within Poland
- Coordinates: 53°19′0″N 17°56′0″E
- Country: Poland
- Voivodeship: Kuyavian-Pomeranian
- County: Bydgoszcz
- Gmina: Koronowo
- Established: 7th century
- Town rights: 1370

Government
  - Mayor: Patryk Stanisław Mikołajewski

Area
  - Total: 28.18 km^{2} (10.88 sq mi)

Population (2024)
  - Total: 10,679
  - Density: 379.0/km^{2} (981.5/sq mi)
- Time zone: UTC+1 (CET)
  - Summer (DST): UTC+2 (CEST)
- Postal code: 86-010
- Car plates: CBY
- Website: http://www.koronowo.pl/

Koronowo (Polish pronunciation: [kɔrɔˈnɔvɔ]; German: Krone / Crone an der Brahe, archaic Polnisch Krone) is a town on the Brda River in north-central Poland, located in the Kuyavian-Pomeranian Voivodeship, 25 km from Bydgoszcz, with 10,679 inhabitants (2024). It is located in the historic region of Kuyavia.

The town of Koronowo has an area of 2,818 ha and this makes it one of the largest towns in Bydgoszcz County. The Koronowo municipality has an area of 41,170 ha and 23,052 inhabitants.

== History ==
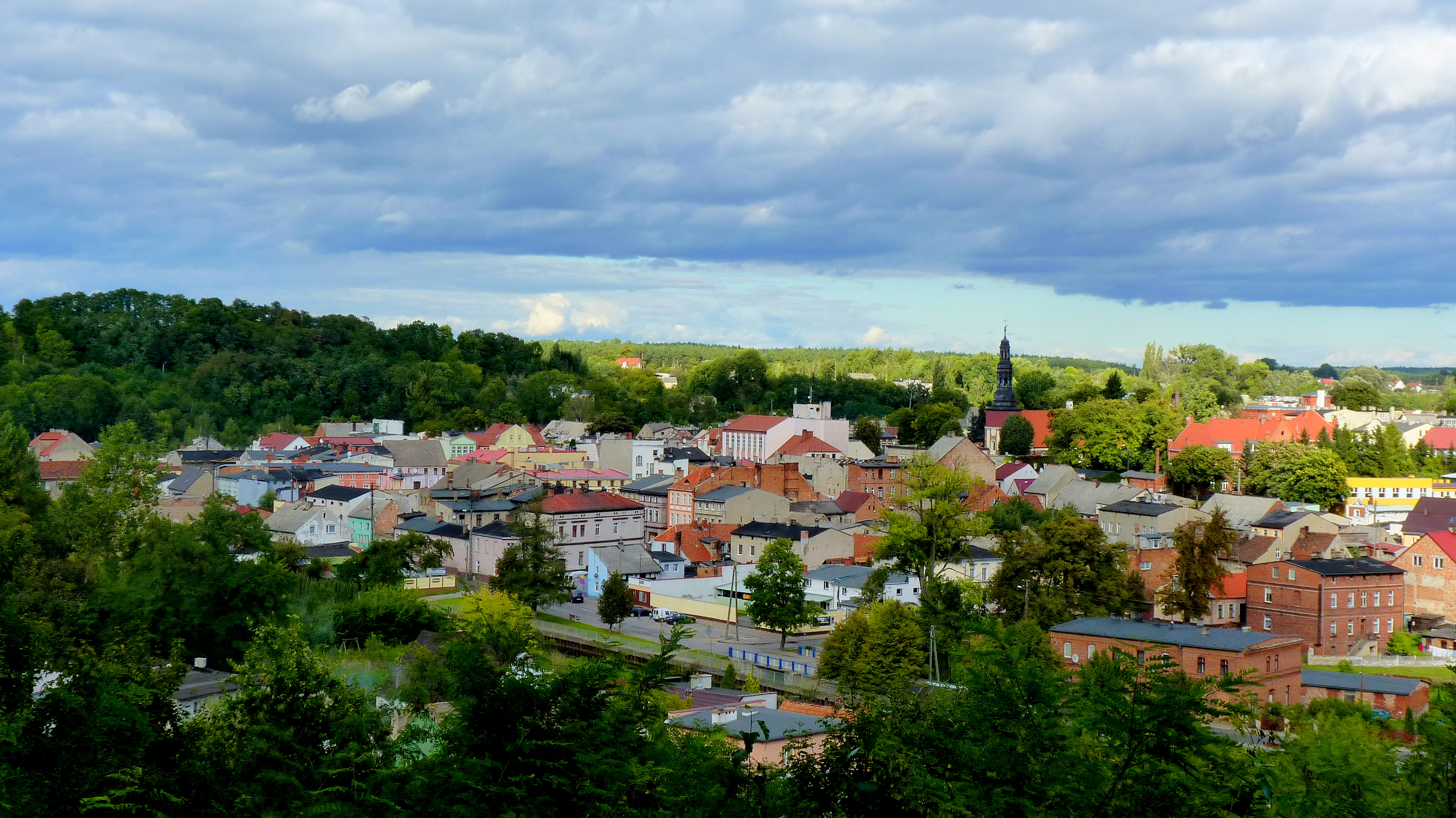
Panorama of Koronowo

In the Early Middle Ages, a Slavic stronghold was built in present-day Koronowo. It was included into the emerging Polish state in the 10th century and finally integrated with it in the 12th century. In 1288 the Cistercians from nearby Byszewo founded an abbey in Koronowo. The settlement prospered due to its location at the intersection of trade routes from Kuyavia and Greater Poland to Gdańsk, and from the Chełmno Land to Western Pomerania. In 1359 King Casimir III the Great vested it with town privileges, which however were not implemented until 1370. The name Koronowo comes from the word korona ("crown"). Administratively it was located within the Inowrocław Voivodeship in the Greater Poland Province. A significant battle took place nearby in 1410 during the Polish–Lithuanian–Teutonic War, in which Poland defeated the Teutonic Knights.

King Casimir IV of Poland by virtue of privileges of 1476 and 1484, established two annual fairs and a weekly market. Among the main activities of the population were crafts, pottery, brewing and agriculture. In the 17th and early 18th century Koronowo suffered due to Swedish invasions, the Great Northern War and epidemics. King Augustus III of Poland established two more annual fairs to help revive the town.

As part of the First Partition of Poland, Koronowo became part of Prussia in 1772. The town of Koronowo was the administrative seat of the Koronowo district in the newly formed province of West Prussia. To distinguish it from the city of Deutsch Krone (Wałcz), it was called Polnisch Krone. From 1807 to 1815, during the Napoleonic era it was part of the Polish Duchy of Warsaw and in 1815, after the duchy's dissolution, it fell back to Prussia.

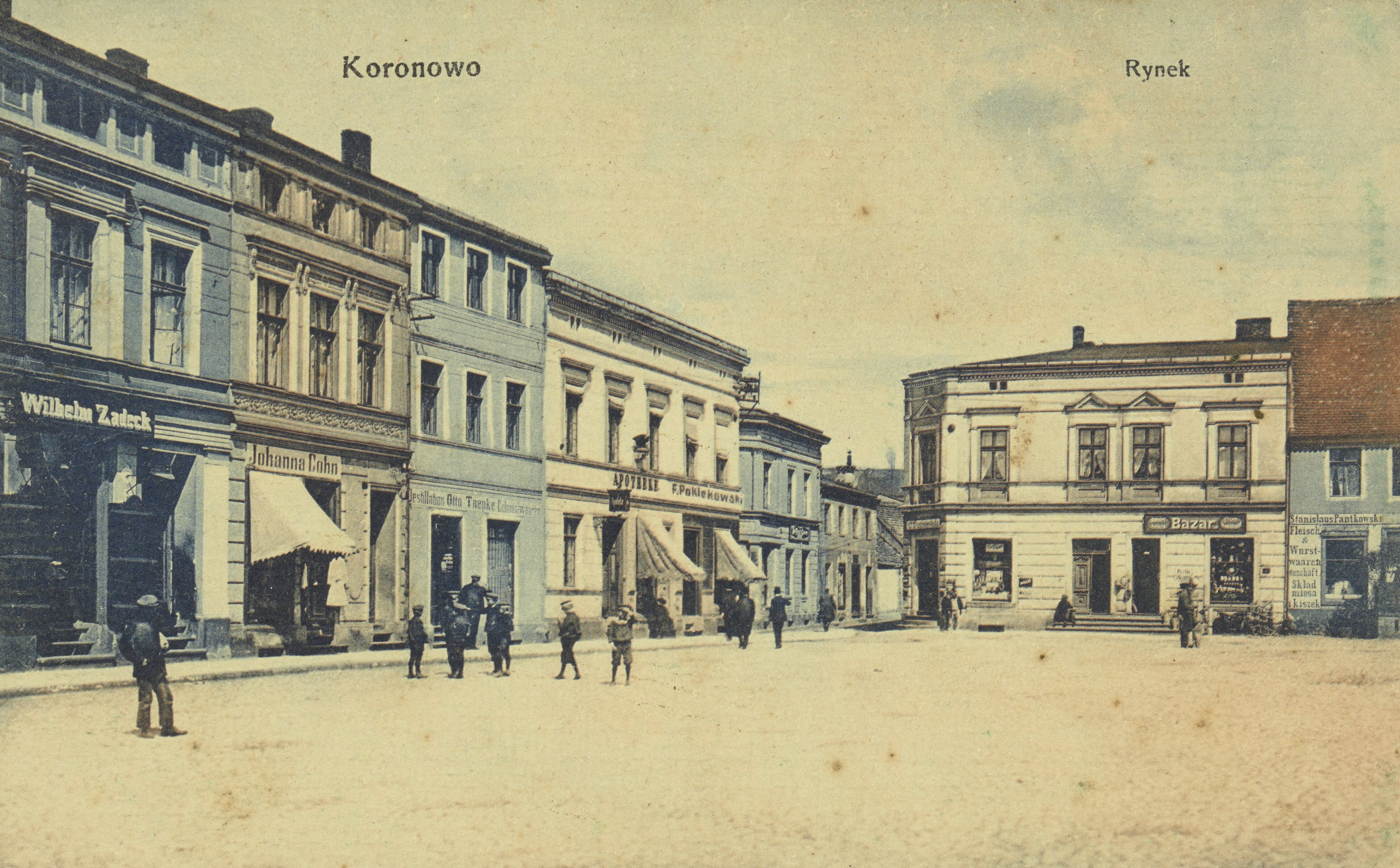
Market Square, before 1928

In 1871, the town became part of Germany. Until the end of World War I, it was part of the Bromberg district in the Prussian Province of Posen. The narrow-gauge railway from Bydgoszcz (Bromberg) was opened in 1895, followed by the standard-gauge railway from Tuchola (Tuchel) in 1909–1914. Due to the provisions of the Versailles Treaty, the town along with the entire Bromberg district had to be ceded by Germany to the Second Polish Republic in 1919. It was part of the Poznań Voivodeship from 1919 to 1938 and of the Pomeranian Voivodeship from 1938 to 1939. 620 Jews lived in Koronowo in 1871, and 40 in 1933.

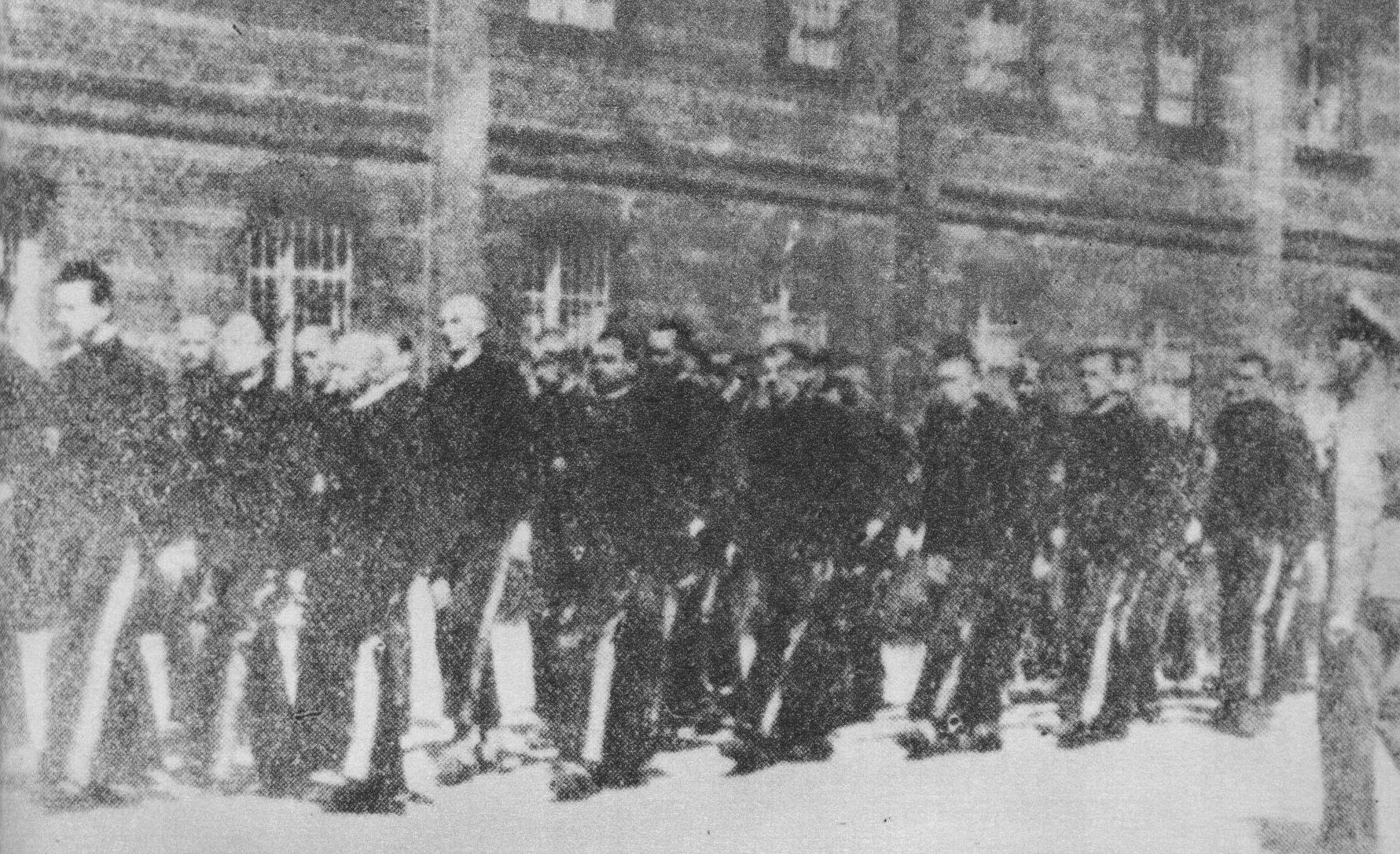
Polish prisoners in German-occupied Koronowo (World War II)

13 Polish soldiers were killed on September 2, 1939, during the German invasion of Poland, which started World War II. In mid-September 1939, the German Einsatzgruppe IV entered the town to commit atrocities against the population. During the German occupation, the Polish population was subject to mass arrests, expulsions and massacres. The Germans established a prison for Poles, in which 606 people died. Many Polish inhabitants of Koronowo and nearby villages were murdered by the Germans in nearby Buszkowo on 5–6 October 1939 and in the forest near Koronowo on 26 October 1939. Among the victims were local merchants, craftsmen and pre-war mayor Maksymilian Talaśka. The Germans burned the bodies of the victims in attempt to cover up the crime. Koronowo was captured by the Soviets in January 1945 and restored to Poland.

== Gallery ==
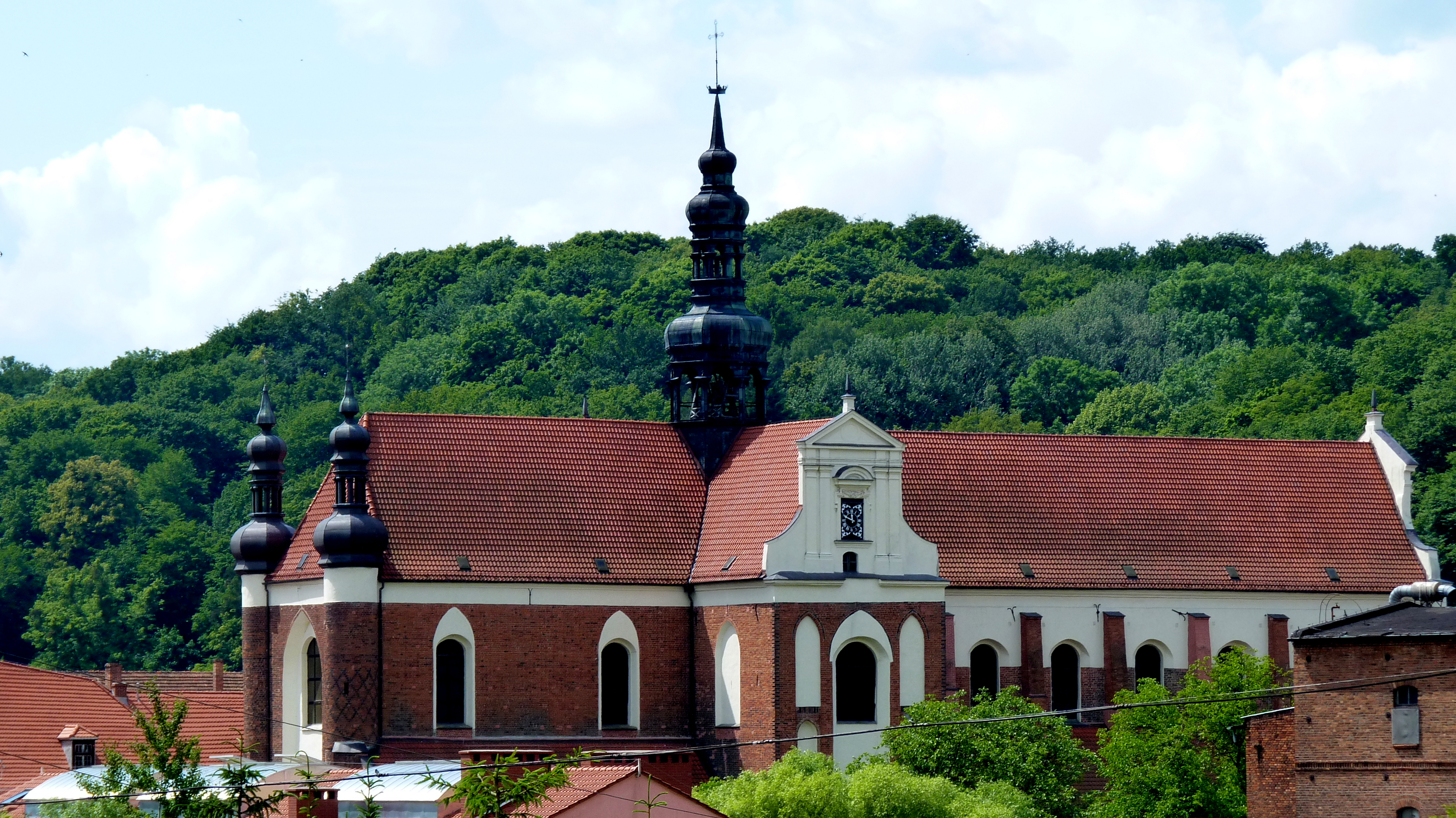
Gothic-Baroque Church of the Assumption of Mary

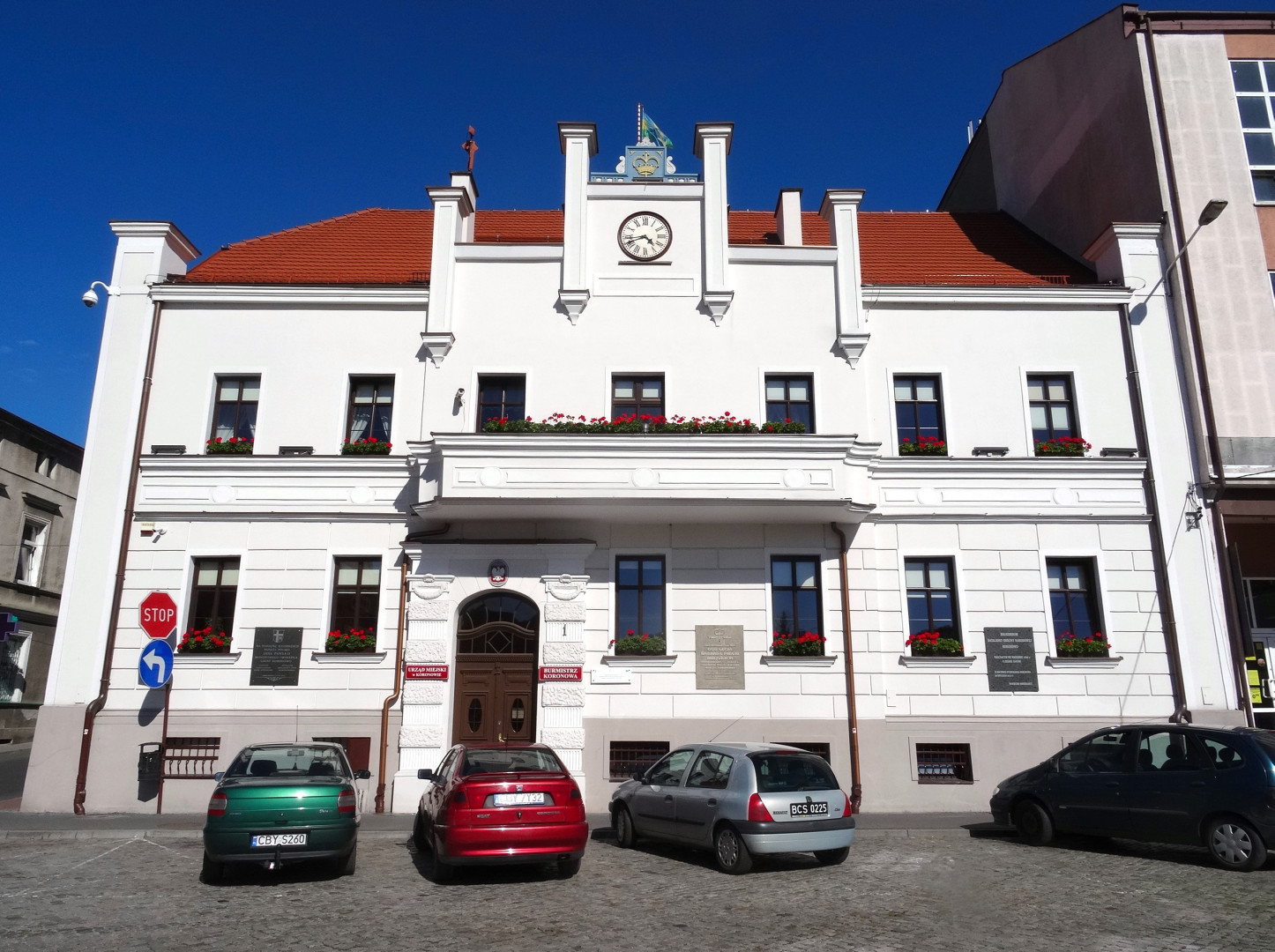
Town Hall (Ratusz)

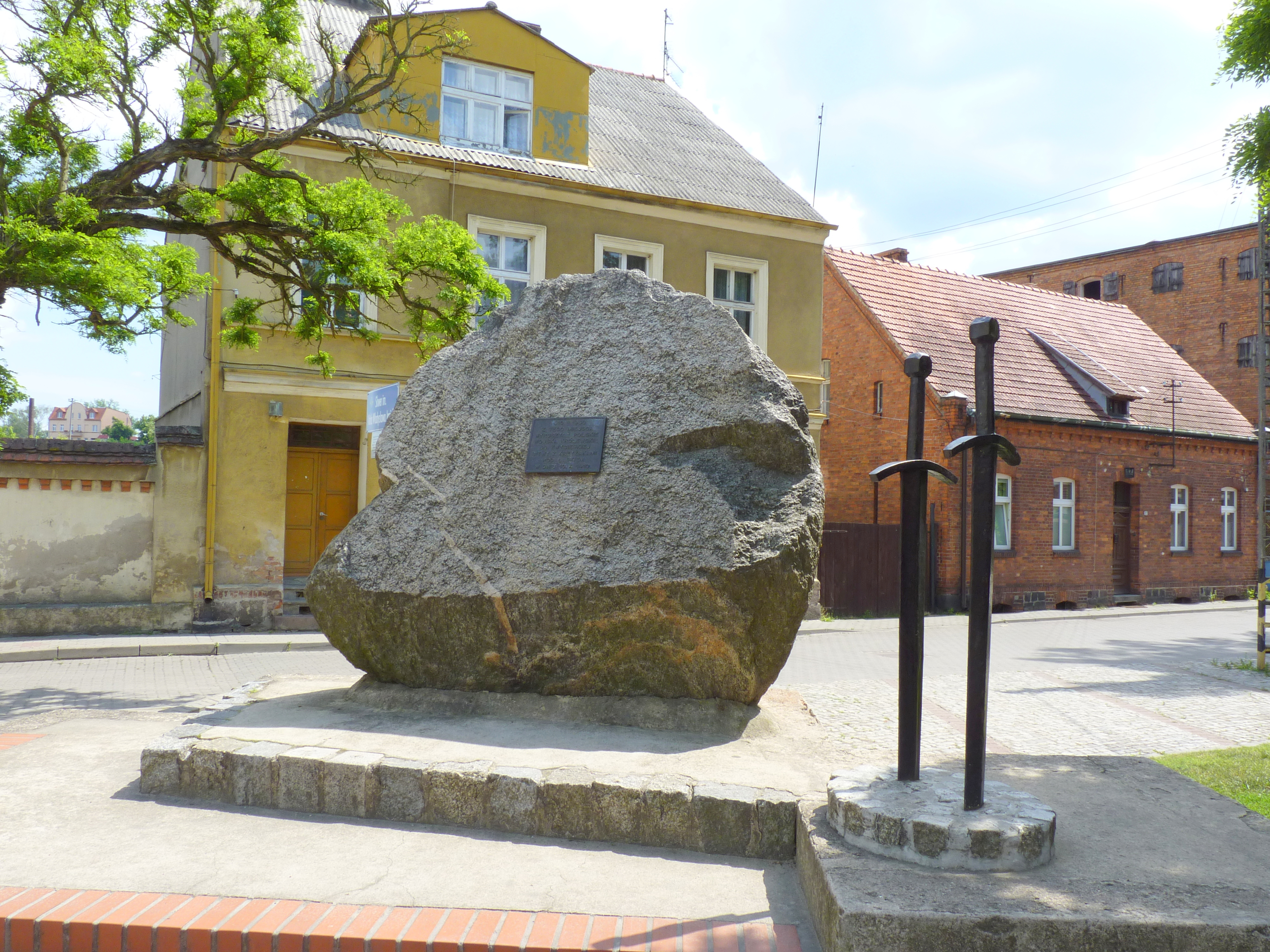
Battle of Koronowo monument

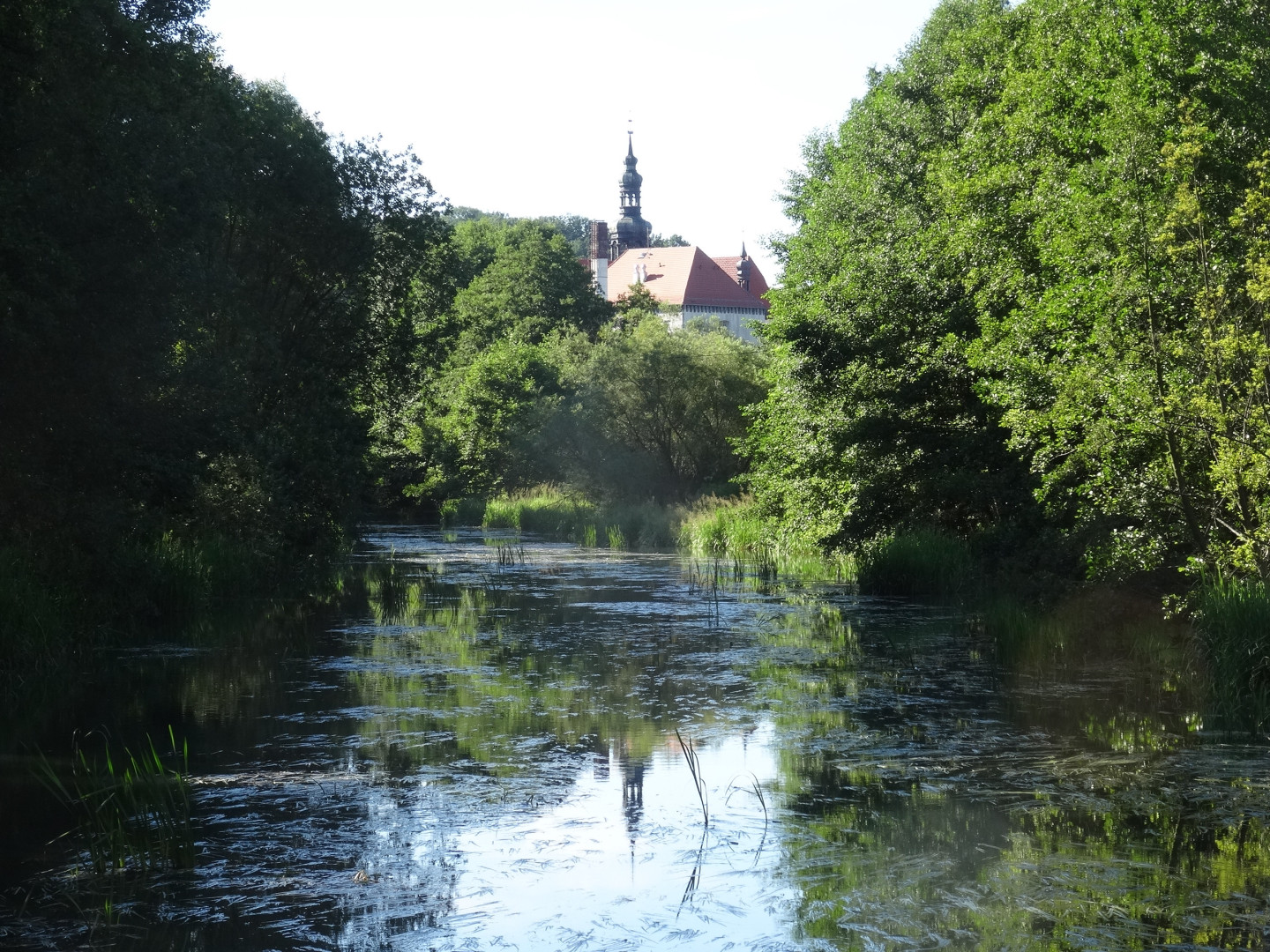
Brda river in Koronowo
