= Sitowiec =

- Village
- Location within Poland
- Coordinates: 53°23′N 17°46′E
- Country: Poland
- Voivodeship: Kuyavian-Pomeranian
- County: Bydgoszcz
- Gmina: Koronowo

Sitowiec [ɕiˈtɔvjɛt͡s] is a village in the administrative district of Gmina Koronowo, within Bydgoszcz County, Kuyavian-Pomeranian Voivodeship, in north-central Poland.
