= Witoldowo =

Witoldowo may refer to the following places:

- Witoldowo, Bydgoszcz County in Kuyavian-Pomeranian Voivodeship (north-central Poland)
- Witoldowo, Radziejów County in Kuyavian-Pomeranian Voivodeship (north-central Poland)
- Witoldowo, Gmina Brześć Kujawski in Kuyavian-Pomeranian Voivodeship (north-central Poland)
- Witoldowo, Greater Poland Voivodeship (west-central Poland)
