= Stopka =

- Village
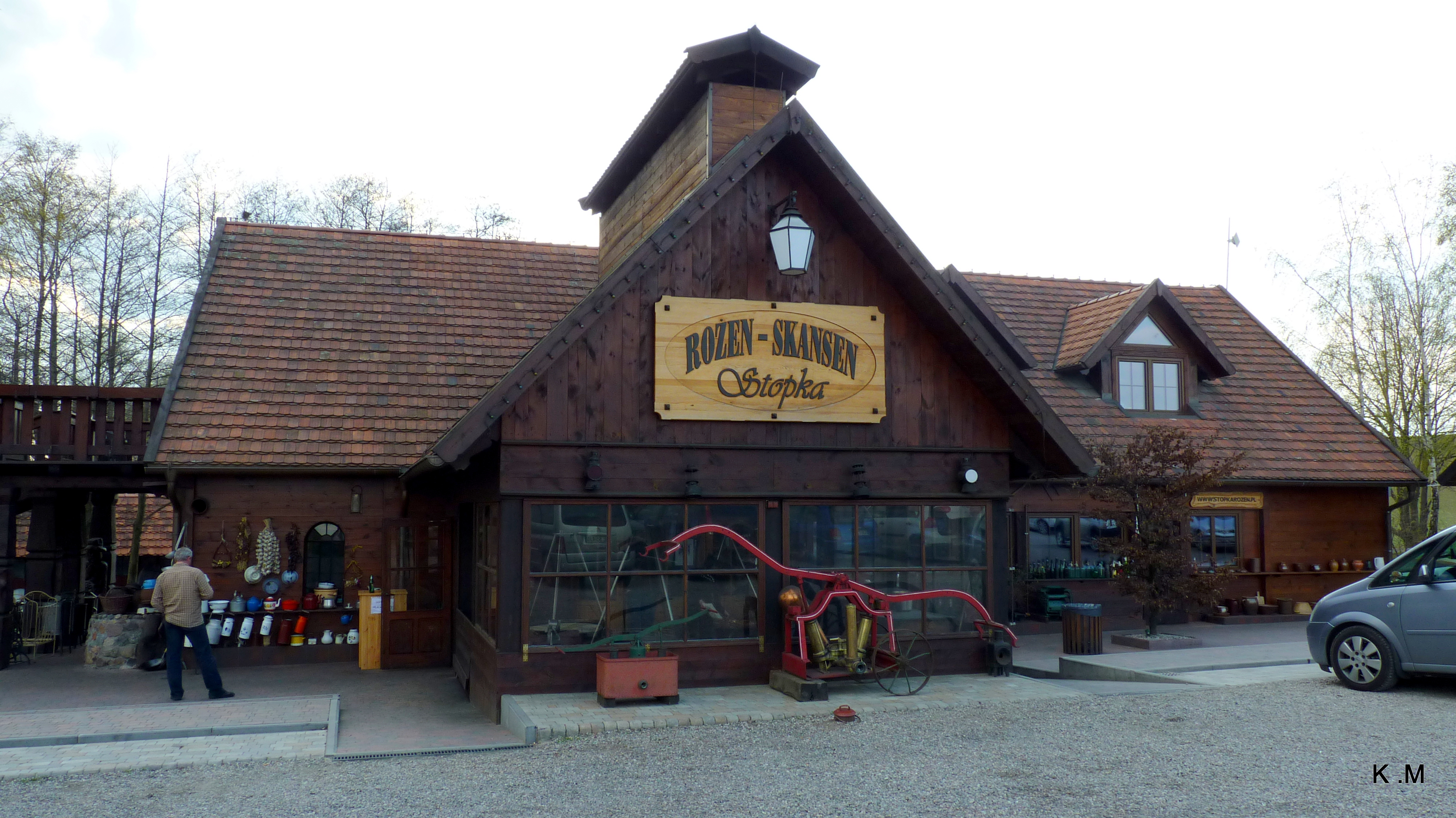

- Location within Poland
- Coordinates: 53°17′17″N 17°55′28″E
- Country: Poland
- Voivodeship: Kuyavian-Pomeranian
- County: Bydgoszcz
- Gmina: Koronowo

Stopka [ˈstɔpka] is a village in the administrative district of Gmina Koronowo, within Bydgoszcz County, Kuyavian-Pomeranian Voivodeship, in north-central Poland.
