= Gogolin, Bydgoszcz County =

Gogolin
- Village
- Location within Poland
- Coordinates: 53°17′N 17°49′E
- Country: Poland
- Voivodeship: Kuyavian-Pomeranian
- County: Bydgoszcz
- Gmina: Koronowo

Gogolin [ɡɔˈɡɔlin] is a village in the administrative district of Gmina Koronowo, within Bydgoszcz County, Kuyavian-Pomeranian Voivodeship, in north-central Poland.
