= Thierry Libaert =

French academic (born 1959)

- Born: 1959 (age 65–66); Lille, France
- Scientific career
- Fields: Organizational communication
- Institutions: Université catholique de Louvain, European Economic and Social Committee

Thierry Libaert is a leading French specialist on Organizational Communication. He has been professor of Organizational Communication at the Université catholique de Louvain (Belgium) where he chaired the Laboratory for the Analysis of Organisational Communication Systems (LASCO). He previously worked for the State industry department, for a public relations agency and as PR manager for one of France's leading companies.

He is also scientific collaborator to the earth & Life Institute and advisor to the European Economic and Social Committee. He is the author of around thirty books.

== Bibliography ==
=== French Books ===
- Des vents porteurs. Comment mobiliser (enfin) pour la planète. Ed Le Pommier. 2020. Lauréat du prix du livre Environnement 2021.
- Piloter votre communication (avec Jacques Suart). Dunod. 2019.
- Communication de crise (avec Bernard Motulsky, Nicolas Baygert, Nicolas Vanderbiest et Mathias Vicherat). Pearson. 2018.
- Déprogrammer l'obsolescence. Les Petits matins (maison d'édition). 2017.
- Les Nouvelles Luttes sociales et environnementales. (Avec Jean-Marie Pierlot). Vuibert. 2015.
- Communication(s). Dunod. 2013.
- Le Lobbying. (With Pierre Bardon). Dunod/Topos. 2012.
- Communication et Environnement, le pacte impossible. Presses Universitaires de France. 2010.
- Toute la fonction communication. (With Aude Riom & Assael Adary). Dunod. 2010.
- La communication corporate. (With Karine Johannes). Dunod. 2010.
- Contredire l'entreprise. (With Andrea Catellani & Jean Marie Pierlot). Presses de l'Université Louvain. 2010.
- Introduction à la communication. Dunod/Topos. 2009.
- Communicator. Toute la communication d'entreprise. (With Marie-Hélène Westphalen). Dunod. 2009.
- La communication des associations. (With Jean-Marie Pierlot). Dunod. 2009.
- La communication externe de l'entreprise. (With Marie Hélène Westphalen). Dunod Topos. 2008.
- Communiquer dans un monde incertain. Village mondial. 2008.
- Le développement durable. With André-Jean Guérin. Dunod. 2008
- La communication sensible au coeur des nouvelles évolutions de l'entreprise. PhD Thesis in communication at the Université catholique de Louvain. 2008
- Environnement et Entreprises. Au-delà des discourse (With Dominique Bourg and Alain Grandjean, Preface of Nicolas Hulot), Village Mondial, 2006
- Les tableaux de bord de la communication (With André de Marco), Dunod, 2006,
- Communication : la nouvelle donne, Village Mondial, 2004
- La Transparence en trompe-l’œil, - Descartes et Cie/ Charles Léopold Mayer, 2003
- La Communication de Crise - Dunod Topos, 2001
- Le Plan de Communication – Dunod, 2000
- La Communication Interne (With Nicole d’Almeida) – Dunod Topos 1998
- La Communication d’Entreprise - Economica – Gestion Poche, 1998
- La Communication de Proximité – Communication locale, communication de terrain – Liaisons, 1996
- La Communication Verte – L’écologie au service de l’entreprise – Liaisons, 1992

=== English Books ===
- ^{Case studies in Crisis Communication. (Writing a chapter on a French example: Société Générale). A.M. Georges & C Pratt (under direction of). Routledge. 2012.}
- Weather and climate risk communication. Under the direction of B Motulsky, J-B Guindon & F Tanguay-Hébert. Author of the chapter: Social media in emergency management. PUQ. 2017.
- The Handbook of crisis communication. Timothy Coombs et S Holladay. Wiley. 2023. (Writing a chapter: Prepare and Manage an Environmental Crisis)
- The European Union, Green Transition and Civil Society. Increasing Consideration of the Role of the Consumer. Chapter from the book "Global Public Goods Communication". Anne Marie Cotton and Sonia Sebastiao. Springer. 2025.
