= Franciszek Dachtera =

Polish Roman Catholic priest and martyr

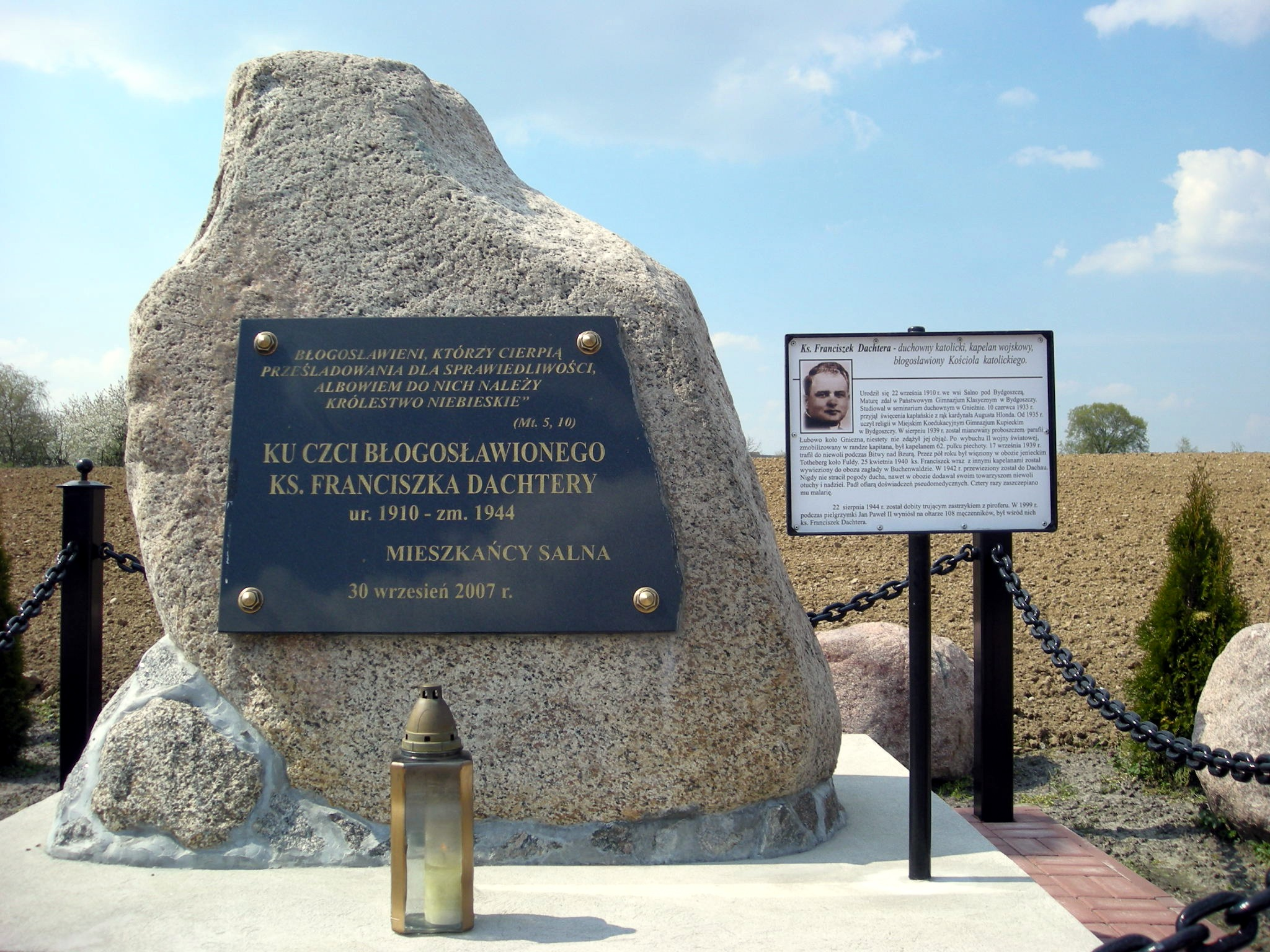
Memorial in Salno, 2008

Franciszek Dachtera (22 September 1910 – 22 August 1942) was a Polish and Roman Catholic priest. He was imprisoned in the Nazi concentration camps at Buchenwald and Dachau, where he died after being tortured in medical experiments. He is one of the 108 Martyrs of World War II.

== Faith ==
Dachtera was ordained as a priest in 1933.

== War ==
In August 1939 he was mobilized as a chaplain to the 62nd Wielkopolska Infantry Regiment in Bydgoszcz. During the Battle of the Bzura he was taken prisoner by the Nazis, and was a prisoner in Oflag IX C Rotenburg starting on 10 December 1939. In April 1940 he was stripped of status as a POW and taken to Buchenwald concentration camp, where he arrived on 25 April 1940, then in July 1942 he was sent to Dachau. Despite his suffering, he remained faithful and maintained a cheerful demeanor, earning the nickname Cherubnik. In December 1942 he was selected for cruel medical experiments done by war criminal Claus Schilling. He was intentionally infected with malaria and not given treatment, resulting in him suffering from jaundice, liver failure, spleen failure, and severe pain. Greatly weakened by the experiments, he died on 22 August 1944, likely from a lethal injection. His body was burned in the crematorium.

== Posthumous honors ==
He was awarded the „Za udział w wojnie obronnej 1939” medal in 1985, Silver Cross of Merit with a rosette in 1992. There are plaques bearing his name on several churches in Poland, and a street was named after him in 2016. Two survivors of the Dachau concentration camp who knew him nominated him for the Servant of God title when the beatification process was announced, and in 1999 he became one of the 108 Blessed Polish Martyrs.

== See also ==
- List of Nazi-German concentration camps
- The Holocaust in Poland
- World War II casualties of Poland
