= Lipinki, Bydgoszcz County =

Lipinki
- Village
- Location within Poland
- Coordinates: 53°20′00″N 17°54′47″E
- Country: Poland
- Voivodeship: Kuyavian-Pomeranian
- County: Bydgoszcz
- Gmina: Koronowo

Lipinki [lʲiˈpʲiŋkʲi] is a village in the administrative district of Gmina Koronowo, within Bydgoszcz County, Kuyavian-Pomeranian Voivodeship, in north-central Poland.
