= Lasco Jamaica =

LASCO Affiliated Companies (formerly LASCO Group of Companies) is a Jamaican holding company with operations in food products, financial services and distribution, founded by the Chinese-born entrepreneur Lascelles Chin.

== History ==
In 2004, the company started a factory in Plymouth, England to manufacture products for the West Indian community in the United Kingdom that they withdrew within two years.

After lengthy litigation, Chin's ex-wife Audrey, a chartered accountant, was awarded 50% shares in the company. The marriage ended in 1994, but the ruling by the Judicial Committee of the Privy Council was not issued until October 1, 2007.

In 2006, Lasco, which sells imported milk powder in Jamaica, unsuccessfully opposed the Jamaican Government's proposal to create a Dairy Development Board.

Until 2008 they were the Official Distributors for Johnson & Johnson products in Jamaica.

- LASCO Skimmed Milk
- iCool water, flavoured water and juice drinks
- LASCO MilkySoy

=== LASCO Distributors, Limited ===
- LASMED
- LASCO Food Drink
- Lasoy Lactose Free
- Milky Soy
- Cereals
- iCool
- LASCO Mixed vegetables
- BabyYum
- Curves

=== Lasco Financial Service Limited ===
- Lasco MoneyGram (money transfer service), agent for MoneyGram

==== Pharmaceuticals ====
- Lasco Vitamins
- Lasmed brand drugs for HIV and Diabetes
- Authorized Representative and Distribution for many pharmaceutical houses around the world

==== Consumer products ====
- Edibles: team vegetables, corned beef, sauces, juices, breakfast cereals, crackers, pastas
- Cleaning products: detergents, disinfectants
- Personal care: deodorants, toothpastes, soaps, baby / and adult diapers

=== Lasco Barbados ===
- Distribution of pharmaceuticals, edibles and personal care products
- Representative of pharmaceutical houses
