= Laboratory for the Analysis of Organisational Communication Systems =

Coordinates: 50.6685°N 4.6123°E

LASCO is the Laboratory for the Analysis of Organizational Communication Systems of the University of Louvain (UCLouvain), located in Louvain-la-Neuve and Mons in Belgium.

The LASCO was created in February 2000 as part of the Communication Department of UCLouvain. Its founders were Pierre de Saint-Georges, Axel Gryspeerdt and Vincent Defourny. LASCO has been chaired by Thierry Libaert and François Lambotte; since 2015, it is chaired by Andrea Catellani.

The LASCO brings together researchers of different origins, united by the common aim of observing and analysing internal and external, strategic and spontaneous phenomena in the field of Organizational Communication, Public Relations, Corporate Communication and Strategic Communication. Such phenomena are to be considered as the origins and consequences of interactions occurred within organizations, or produced by them.

The LASCO originated from the consistent continuation of work done inside the Communication Department in the Public Relations sector (from 1961 onwards, via the CETEDI, Centre of Diffusion Techniques and Public Relations) and of Institutional Mediation (from 1994 on). Correlations between communication and organizations have always constituted a traditional research field at the Communication Department at UCLouvain. The University of Louvain is thereby a Europe-wide recognised pioneer in this area: Organisational Communication has been taught since 1958. Management of Organisational Communication and Public Relations currently represents a core training feature of the Graduate Degree in Communication at UCLouvain.
