= Łąsko Wielkie =

- Village
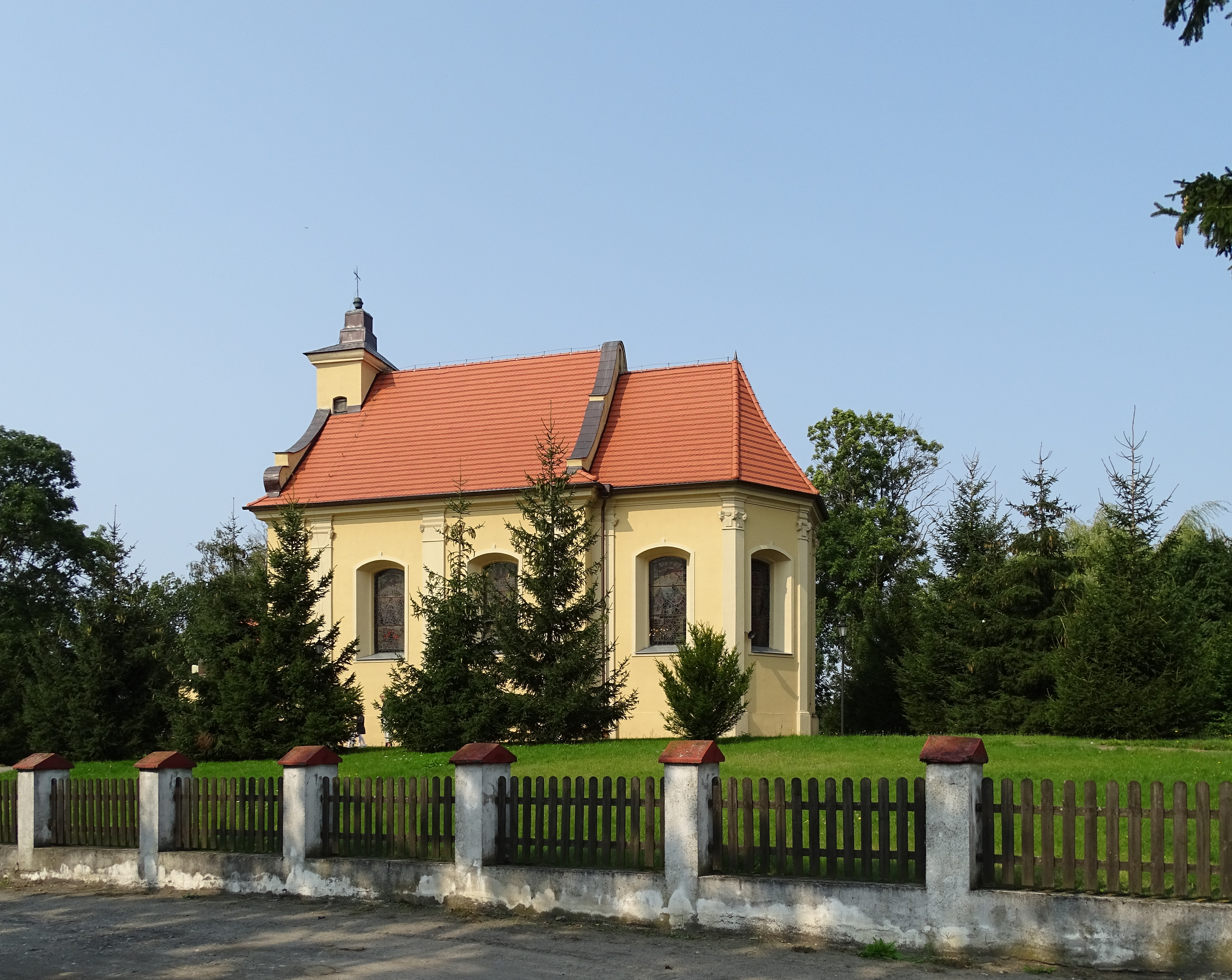
- Church of Saint Anne from 1772

- Location within Poland
- Coordinates: 53°21′N 17°50′E
- Country: Poland
- Voivodeship: Kuyavian-Pomeranian
- County: Bydgoszcz
- Gmina: Koronowo
- Population: 420
- Time zone: UTC+1 (CET)
  - Summer (DST): UTC+2 (CEST)
- Vehicle registration: CBY

Łąsko Wielkie [ˈwɔ̃skɔ ˈvjɛlkʲɛ] is a village in the administrative district of Gmina Koronowo, within Bydgoszcz County, Kuyavian-Pomeranian Voivodeship, in north-central Poland.

== History ==
The village is mentioned in documents as early as the late 13th century (1288), and in 1358 it was acquired by the Cistercian Order from nearby Koronowo. On October 10, 1410, a victorious battle between Polish troops and the Teutonic Knights took place near the village. Between 1765 and 1772, St. Anne's Church was built in the Baroque style and then rebuilt in 1892; the interior décor and furnishings come mainly from the 18th century, from the workshop of the Chełmno sculptor Ephraim Gerlach.

During the German occupation of Poland (World War II), in 1941, the occupiers carried out expulsions of Poles, who were deported either to a transit camp in Toruń or to the Potulice concentration camp. Houses and farms of expelled Poles were handed over to German colonists as part of the Lebensraum policy.
