= Buszkowo, Bydgoszcz County =

Buszkowo
- Village
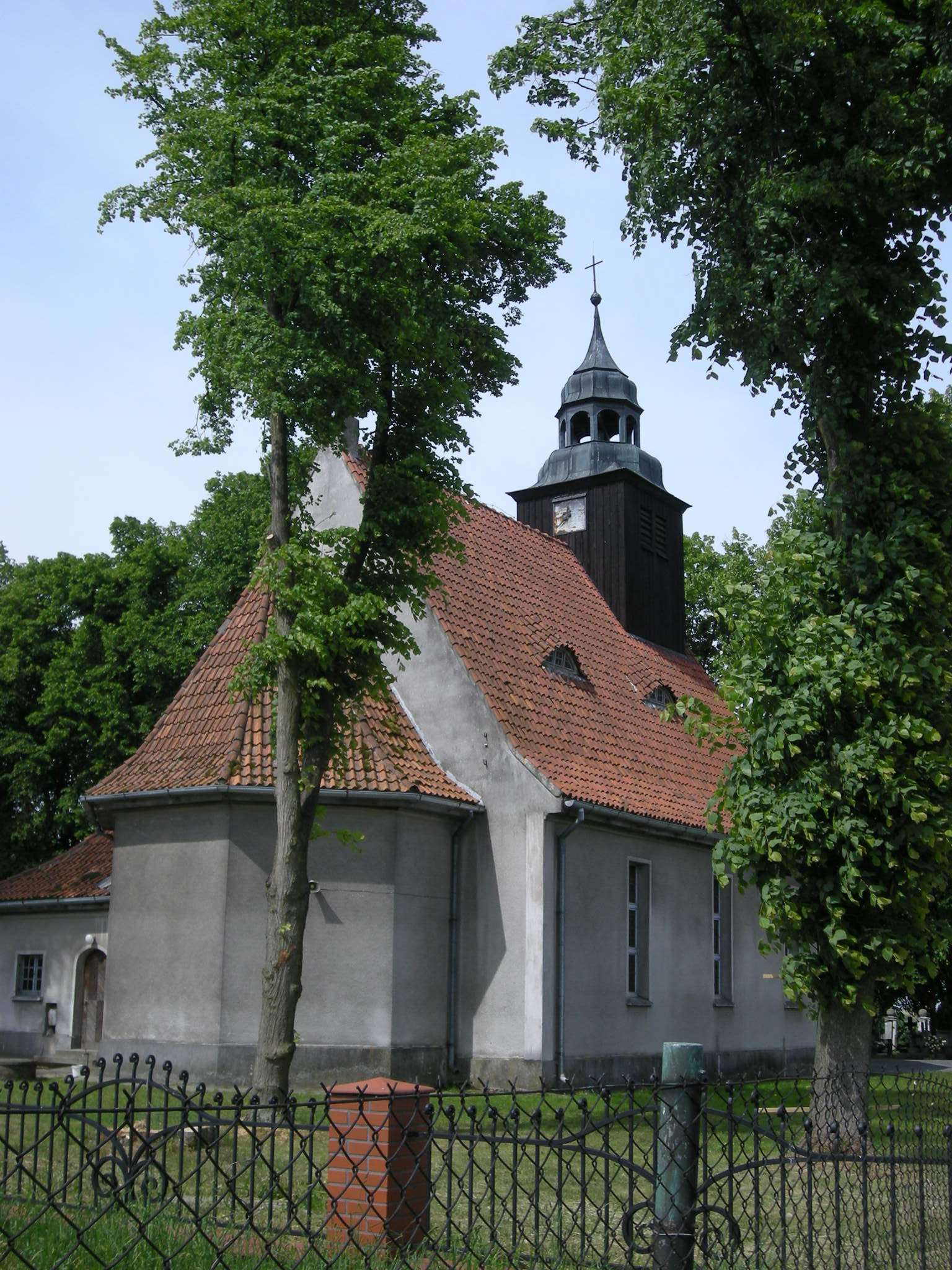
- Holy Spirit church in Buszkowo

- Location within Poland
- Coordinates: 53°20′43″N 17°51′43″E
- Country: Poland
- Voivodeship: Kuyavian-Pomeranian
- County: Bydgoszcz
- Gmina: Koronowo
- Population: 400
- Time zone: UTC+1 (CET)
  - Summer (DST): UTC+2 (CEST)
- Vehicle registration: CBY

Buszkowo [buʂˈkɔvɔ] is a village in the administrative district of Gmina Koronowo, within Bydgoszcz County, Kuyavian-Pomeranian Voivodeship, in north-central Poland. It is located in the historic region of Kuyavia.

== History ==
During the German occupation (World War II), the forest near Buszkowo was the site of a large massacre of Poles from Koronowo and nearby villages, committed by the Germans on October 5–6, 1939 as part of the Intelligenzaktion. In 1941, the occupiers carried out expulsions of Poles, whose farms were then handed over to German colonists as part of the Lebensraum policy. Expelled Poles were placed in a transit camp in Toruń, and then deported either to the Warsaw District of the General Government in German-occupied central Poland or to forced labour in Germany.

== Notable people ==
- Aleksander Mendyk (1979–2008), Polish heavy metal singer and guitarist
