= Bydgoszcz County =

Bydgoszcz County Powiat bydgoski
- County
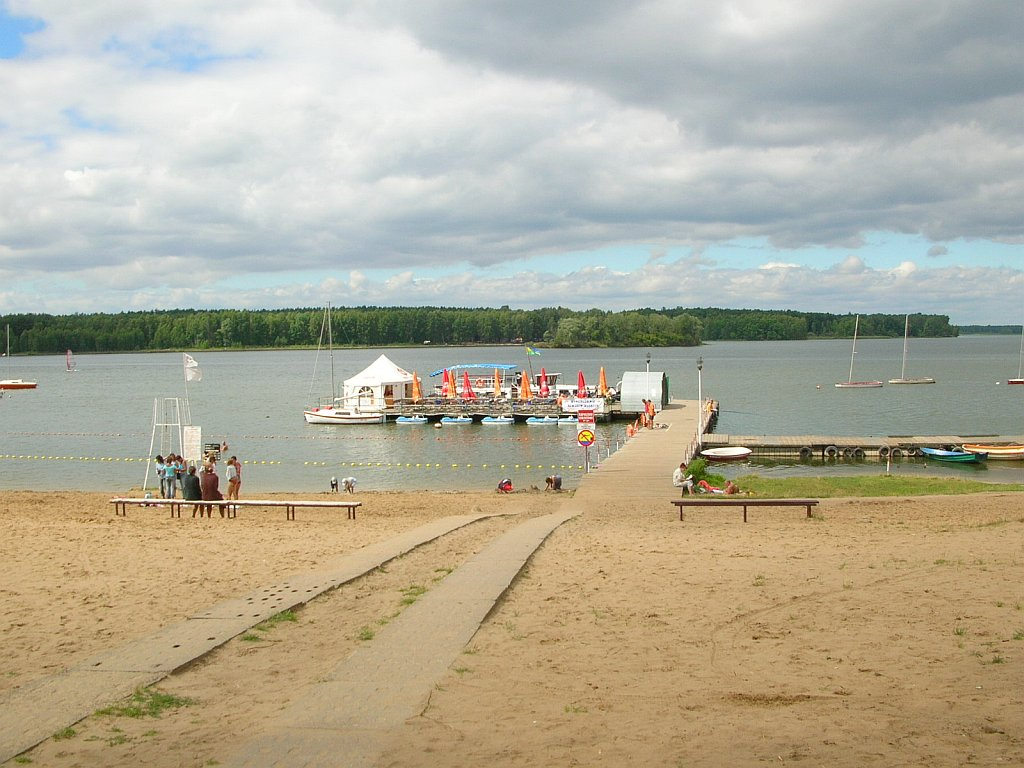

- Flag Coat of arms

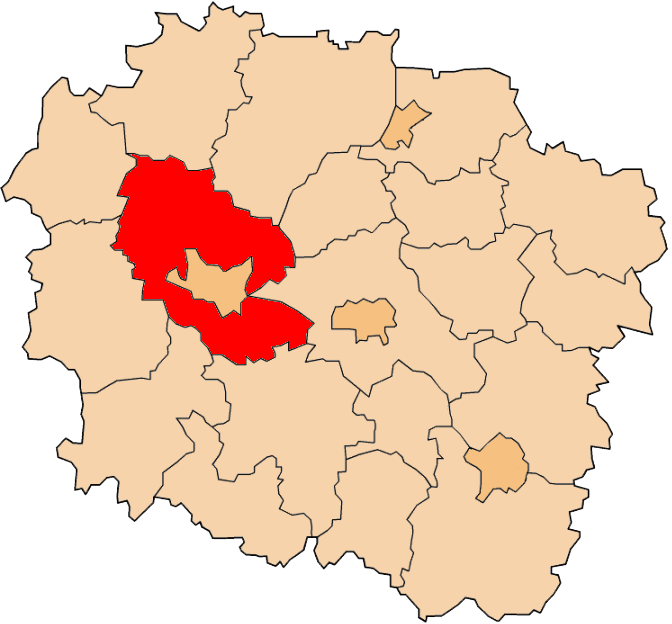
- Location within the voivodeship

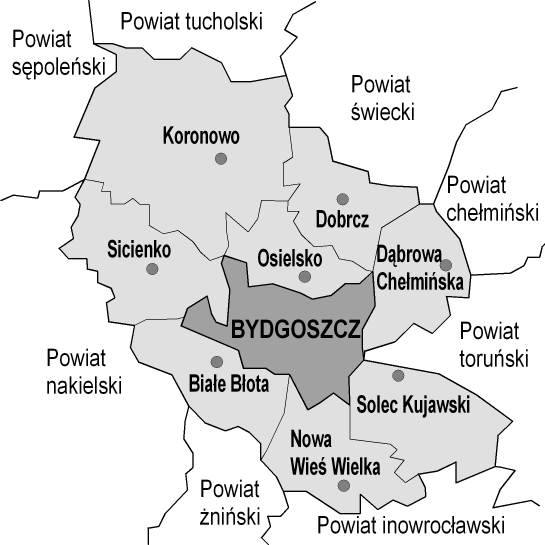
- Division into gminas
- Coordinates (Bydgoszcz): 53°7′N 18°0′E
- Country: Poland
- Voivodeship: Kuyavian-Pomeranian
- Seat: Bydgoszcz
- Gminas: Total 8: Gmina Białe Błota; Gmina Dąbrowa Chełmińska; Gmina Dobrcz; Gmina Koronowo; Gmina Nowa Wieś Wielka; Gmina Osielsko; Gmina Sicienko; Gmina Solec Kujawski

Area
  - Total: 1,394.8 km^{2} (538.5 sq mi)

Population (2019)
  - Total: 118,041
  - Density: 84.629/km^{2} (219.19/sq mi)
  - Urban: 26,814
  - Rural: 91,227
- Car plates: CBY
- Website: powiat.bydgoski.pl

Bydgoszcz County (Polish: powiat bydgoski) is a unit of territorial administration and local government (powiat) in Kuyavian-Pomeranian Voivodeship, north-central Poland. It was created on 1 January 1999 as a result of the Polish local government reforms passed in 1998. Its administrative seat is the city of Bydgoszcz, although the city is not part of the county (it constitutes a separate city county). The only towns in Bydgoszcz County are Solec Kujawski, which lies 17 km (11 mi) east of Bydgoszcz, and Koronowo, 23 km (14 mi) north of Bydgoszcz.

The county covers an area of 1,394.8 square kilometres (538.5 sq mi). As of 2019 its total population is 118,041, out of which the population of Solec Kujawski is 15,652, that of Koronowo is 11,162, and the rural population is 91,227.

== Politics ==
Voters elect a unicameral Bydgoszcz County Council (Polish: Rada Powiatu Bydgoskiego) consisting of a 21-members. The council is elected under proportional representation in free elections for a 4-year term. Executive body is county executive board (zarząd powiatu) consists of five members elected by the council. The Board is headed by the starosta (Starosta Bydgoski).

=== Council districts ===
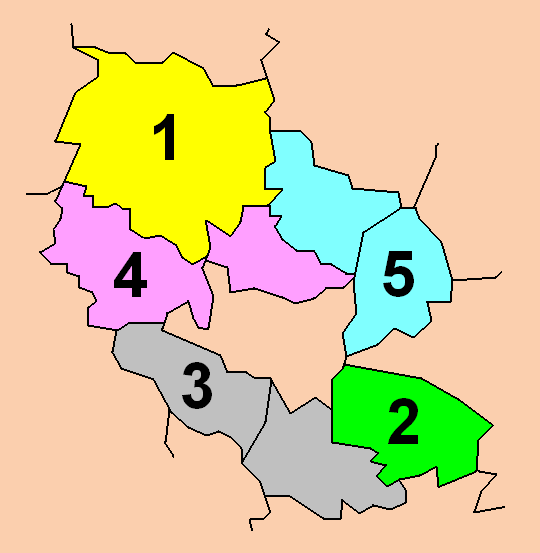
Electoral districts

Members of the council are elected from five districts, serve four-year terms. Districts does not have the constituencies formal names. Instead, each constituency has a number and territorial description.

| Number | Seats | Gmina(s) |
|---|---|---|
| 1st | 5 | Koronowo |
| 2nd | 3 | Solec Kujawski |
| 3rd | 5 | Białe Błota, Nowa Wieś Wielka |
| 4th | 4 | Osielsko, Sicienko |
| 5th | 4 | Dąbrowa Chełmińska, Dobrcz |

== Neighbouring counties ==
Apart from the city of Bydgoszcz, Bydgoszcz County is also bordered by Tuchola County to the north, Świecie County and Chełmno County to the north-east, Toruń County to the east, Inowrocław County to the south, Żnin County to the south-west, Nakło County to the west, and Sępólno County to the north-west.

== Administrative divisions ==
The county is subdivided into eight gminas (two urban-rural and six rural). These are listed in the following table, in descending order of population.

| Gmina | Type | Area (km^{2}) | Population (2019) | Seat |
|---|---|---|---|---|
| Gmina Koronowo | urban-rural | 411.7 | 24,170 | Koronowo |
| Gmina Białe Błota | rural | 122.1 | 22,095 | Białe Błota |
| Gmina Solec Kujawski | urban-rural | 175.4 | 16,815 | Solec Kujawski |
| Gmina Osielsko | rural | 102.9 | 14,510 | Osielsko |
| Gmina Dobrcz | rural | 130.4 | 11,734 | Dobrcz |
| Gmina Sicienko | rural | 179.5 | 10,217 | Sicienko |
| Gmina Nowa Wieś Wielka | rural | 148.5 | 10,156 | Nowa Wieś Wielka |
| Gmina Dąbrowa Chełmińska | rural | 124.6 | 8,344 | Dąbrowa Chełmińska |

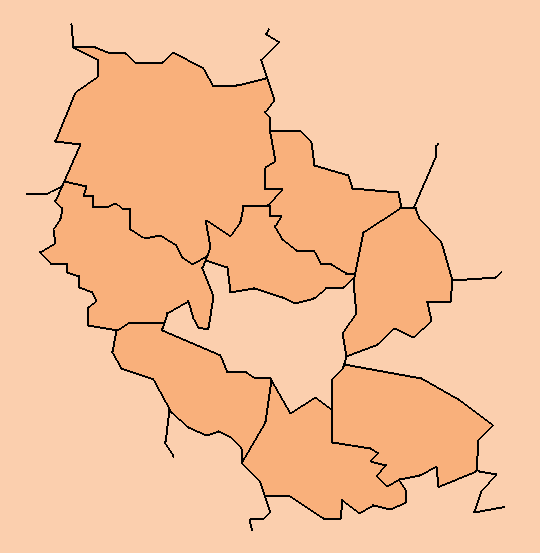
