= List of municipal flags of Kuyavian–Pomeranian Voivodeship =

The following list includes flags of municipalities (gminas) in the Kuyavian–Pomeranian Voivodeship, Poland.

Flag of Kuyavian–Pomeranian Voivodeship

According to the definition, a flag is a sheet of fabric of a specific shape, colour and meaning, attached to a spar or mast. It may also include the coat of arms or emblem of the administrative unit concerned. In Poland, territorial units (municipal, city and county councils) may establish flags in accordance with the Act of 21 December 1978 on badges and uniforms. In its original version, it only allowed territorial units to establish coats of arms. Despite that many cities and municipalities adopted resolutions and used a flag as their symbol. It was not until the Act of 29 December 1998 amending certain acts in connection with the implementation of the state system reform that the right of voivodeships, counties and municipalities to establish this symbol of a territorial unit was officially confirmed.

In 2024, 105 out of 144 municipalities in Kujawsko-Pomorskie Voivodeship had their own flag. This symbol, since 2000, has been established by the voivodeship itself.

== List of municipal flags ==
=== Aleksandrow County ===
Municipality	Flag	Description
City of Aleksandrów Kujawski		The city flag was established by Resolution No. LXXV/599/24 of 25 March 2024. It is a rectangular flag with proportions 5:8, divided into three vertical stripes: two red and one white in the ratio of 3:10:3. In the central part of the flag the emblem from the city coat of arms is placed.
Gmina Aleksandrów Kujawski		The municipal flag was established by Resolution No. XIII/178/08 of 31 March 2008. It is a rectangular flag with proportions 5:8, red in colour, in the central part of the flag is the emblem from the municipal coat of arms.
Gmina Bądkowo		The flag of the municipality, designed by Krzysztof Dorcz, was established by the resolution No XXII-135/2009 of 22 April 2009. It is a rectangular flag with proportions of 5:8, divided into two horizontal stripes: yellow and red in the ratio of 1:3. In the central part of the flag is an emblem from the municipal coat of arms.
City of Ciechocinek		The city's flag was established by Resolution No. XXXVIII/222/17 of 27 October 2017. It is a rectangular flag with proportions of 5:8 in blue in colour, in the central part of the flag is the emblem from the city's coat of arms.
Gmina Koneck		Flaga gminy została ustanowiona uchwałą nr X/61/03 z 14 listopada 2003. Jest to prostokątny płat tkaniny o proporcjach 5:8, podzielony na dwa równe pionowe pasy: żółty i błękitny. W jego centralnej części umieszczono herb gminy.
City of Nieszawa		The city's flag was established by Resolution No. XXVII/177/17 of 30 November 2017. It is a rectangular flag with proportions of 5:8, white in colour, through the centre of which runs a horizontal wavy blue stripe in a ratio of 1:3. In the central part of the flag is the city's coat of arms.
Gmina Waganiec		The municipality's flag was established by Resolution No. XXXII/189/13 of 11 November 2013. It is a rectangular flag with proportions of 5:8, divided into two horizontal stripes: gold and red in a ratio of 3:1. In the central part of the upper stripe the municipal coat of arms is placed.
Gmina Zakrzewo		The municipal flag is a rectangular flag with proportions of 5:8, divided into two equal vertical stripes: blue and red. In the central part of the flag is the municipal coat of arms.

=== Brodnica County ===
Municipality	Flag	Description
Gmina Bartniczka		The municipal flag was established by Resolution No. XXIV/115/09 of 20 June 2009. It is a rectangular flag with proportions of 5:8, blue in colour, in the central part of the flag the emblem from the municipal coat of arms is placed.
Gmina Bobrowo		The municipality's flag was established by Resolution No. XXVII/280/13 of 21 August 2013. It is a rectangular flag with proportions of 5:8, divided into three vertical stripes: two yellow (gold) and one red in the ratio of 1:2:1. In the central part of the flag the emblem from the municipal coat of arms is placed.
City of Brodnica		The city's flag was given a favourable opinion by the Polish Vexillological Society on 15 March 1998. It is a rectangular flag with proportions of 5:8, divided into four horizontal stripes: white, blue, white and red in a ratio of 8:1:1:10. The city's coat of arms is placed in the upper left corner of the flag. The colours of the flag refer to the flag of Poland, and the blue stripe to the Drwęca River.
Gmina Brodnica		The municipal flag was established by Resolution No. XXVII/171/2001 of 28 November 2001. It is a rectangular flag with proportions 5:8, divided into two red parts: the upper one, with two white horizontal wavy lines, and the lower one, with a white hand from the municipal coat of arms on the left side of the flag.
Gmina Brzozie		The municipality's flag, designed by Krzysztof Mikulski and Lech-Tadeusz Karczewski, was established by Resolution No. X/60/2015 of 8 December 2015. It is a rectangular flag with proportions of 5:8, divided into three horizontal stripes: white, black and red in a ratio of 0.75:35.5:0.75. In the central part of the flag the emblem from the municipal coat of arms is placed.
City and gmina Jabłonowo Pomorskie		The municipal flag was established by Resolution No. X/50/07 of 6 July 2007. It is a rectangular flag with proportions of 5:8, divided into three horizontal stripes: two red and one yellow in the ratio 2:1:1.
Gmina Osiek		The municipal flag, designed by Krzysztof Mikulski and Lech-Tadeusz Karczewski, was established by virtue of resolution no. XIX/78/2004 of 29 December 2004. It is a rectangular flag with proportions of 5:8, red in colour, in the central part of the flag the emblem from the municipal coat of arms is placed.

=== City of Bydgoszcz ===
Flag	Description
	The city's flag was established by Resolution No. XLIV/951/2005 of 30 March 2005. It is a rectangular flag with proportions of 5:8, divided into three equal horizontal stripes: white, red and blue. In the central part of the flag is the coat of arms of the city.

=== Bydgoszcz County ===
Municipality	Flag	Description
Gmina Białe Błota		The municipal flag was established by Resolution No. XII/117/2003 of 24 November 2003. It is a rectangular flag, divided into two equal vertical stripes: green and yellow. In the central part of the flag is the municipal coat of arms.
Gmina Dąbrowa Chełmińska		The municipal flag was established by means of Resolution No. XXX/232/06 of 14 June 2006. It is a rectangular flag with proportions of 5:8, white in colour, in the central part of the flag the municipal coat of arms is placed.
City and gmina Koronowo		The municipal flag is a rectangular flag with proportions of 3:5, divided into three equal horizontal stripes: blue, yellow and green. In the central part of the flag is the municipal coat of arms.
Gmina Nowa Wieś Wielka		The municipal flag, designed by Lech-Tadeusz Karczewski, was established by means of Resolution No. XXXIII/338/06 of 7 February 2006. It is a rectangular flag with proportions of 5:8 in red in colour, in the central part of which the coat of arms of the municipality is placed, and underneath it the white horizontal stripe.
Gmina Osielsko		The municipal flag was established by Resolution No. VI/59/2002 of 9 October 2002. It is a rectangular flag with proportions of 5:8, divided into two equal vertical stripes: green and yellow. In the central part of the flag is the municipal coat of arms.
City and gmina Solec Kujawski		The municipal flag was established by Resolution No. V/30/2003 of 14 February 2003. It is a rectangular flag with proportions of 5:8, divided into three equal vertical stripes: red, white and blue. In the central part of the flag is an emblem from the municipal coat of arms.

=== Golub-Dobrzyń County ===
Municipality	Flag	Description
Gmina Ciechocin		The municipal flag was established by Resolution No. XX/89/2012 of 30 May 2012. It is a rectangular flag with proportions of 5:8, blue in colour, on the left side of the flag is the emblem from the municipal coat of arms.
City of Golub-Dobrzyń		The city's flag, designed by Krzysztof Mikulski and Lech-Tadeusz Karczewski, was established by Resolution No. XXIII/242/2001 of 1 March 2001. It is a rectangular flag with proportions of 5:8 in red, with a white St Andrew's cross. In the central part of the flag is the coat of arms of the city.
Gmina Golub-Dobrzyń		The flag of the municipality was established by Resolution No. XXXIV.190.2017 of 2 June 2017. It is a rectangular flag with proportions of 5:8, red in colour, on the left side of the flag is the coat of arms of the municipality, divided in half by a white wavy line, which is an extension of the coat of arms.
City and gmina Kowalewo Pomorskie		The current version of the municipal flag, designed by Alfred Znamierowski, was established by Resolution No. XIII/104/19 of 17 December 2019. It is a rectangular flag with proportions of 5:8, red in colour, in the central part of the flag is the municipal coat of arms.

=== City of Grudziądz ===
Flag	Description
	The city's flag was established on 23 November 1990. It is a rectangular flag with proportions of 5:8, divided into three equal horizontal stripes: yellow, red and white.

=== Grudziądz County ===
Municipality	Flag	Description
Gmina Grudziądz		The municipality's flag is a rectangular flag, divided into three vertical stripes: two blue and one red. In the central part of the flag is the municipal coat of arms.
City and gmina Łasin		The municipal flag was established by Resolution No. XXX/196/98 of 27 January 1998. It is a rectangular flag with proportions of 5:8, divided into three equal horizontal stripes: red, white and black. In the central part of the flag is the municipal coat of arms.

=== Inowrocław County ===
Municipality	Flag	Description
City and gmina Gniewkowo		The municipal flag is a rectangular flag,red in colour, in the central part of the flag is the emblem from the municipal coat of arms.
City and gmina Kruszwica		The municipality's flag is a rectangular flag with proportions of 5:8, divided into two equal horizontal stripes: white and green. The municipal coat of arms is placed in the central part of the upper stripe.
City of Inowrocław		The city's flag was established on 26 April 1996. It is a rectangular flag with proportions of 5:8, divided into three equal horizontal stripes: gold, red and white.
City and gmina Pakość		The municipality's flag is a rectangular flag with proportions 5:8, white in colour with a blue border, in the central part of the flag is the municipal coat of arms is placed.
Gmina Rojewo		The municipal flag was established by Resolution No. XXXVIII/248/2002 of 20 June 2002. It is a rectangular flag with proportions of 5:8, divided into three equal vertical stripes: yellow, red and white. In the central part of the flag is an emblem from the municipal coat of arms.
Gmina Złotniki Kujawskie		The municipal flag was established by Resolution No. XXX/313/2001 of 30 October 2001. It is a rectangular flag with proportions of 5:8, divided into four equal horizontal stripes: red, yellow, white and red. In the central part of the flag may be placed the municipal coat of arms.

=== Lipno County ===
Municipality	Flag	Description
Gmina Chrostkowo		The flag of the municipality, designed by Krzysztof Mikulski, was established by Resolution No. XII/71/2016 of 27 June 2016. It is a rectangular flag with proportions of 5:8, blue in colour, in the central part of the flag the emblem from the municipal coat of arms is placed.
City and gmina Dobrzyń nad Wisłą		The municipal flag is a rectangular flag, divided into three equal horizontal stripes: blue, gold and green.
City and gmina Kikół		The municipal flag was established by Resolution No. XXII/152/02 of 8 May 2002. It is a rectangular flag with proportions of 5:8, divided into three equal vertical stripes: white, red and yellow. In the central part of the flag is the emblem from the municipal coat of arms.
City of Lipno		The city's flag was established by Resolution No. XLV/435/2014 of 17 September 2014. It is a rectangular flag with proportions of 5:8, divided into three horizontal stripes: green, white and red in the ratio of 1:5, 3:5 and 1:5. In the central part of the flag is the emblem from the city's coat of arms.
Gmina Lipno		The municipality's flag, designed by Krzysztof Mikulski and Lech-Tadeusz Karczewski, was established by Resolution No. XXXVI/239/14 of 24 June 2014. It is a rectangular flag with proportions of 5:8, divided into two horizontal stripes: blue and green in a ratio of 4:1. In the central part of the upper stripe of the flag is the emblem from the municipal coat of arms.
Gmina Tłuchowo		The municipal flag was established by Resolution No. XXIX/183/2010 of 15 June 2010. It is a rectangular flag with proportions of 5:8, divided into two equal parts: the left one, blue, with the emblem from the municipal coat of arms and the right one, divided into five equal horizontal stripes: three blue and two yellow.
Gmina Wielgie		The municipal flag, designed by Lech-Tadeusz Karczewski, was established by means of Resolution No. XLV/284/10 of 1 October 2010. It is a rectangular flag with proportions of 5:8, divided into three vertical stripes: two yellow and red in the ratio of 1:2:1. In the central part of the flag is an emblem from the municipal coat of arms.

=== Mogilno County ===
Municipality	Flag	Description
Gmina Dąbrowa		The municipality's flag is a rectangular flag with proportions of 5:8, divided into three vertical stripes: two green and one yellow. In the central part of the flag is the municipal coat of arms.
City and gmina Mogilno		At present, the municipal flag is a rectangular flag with proportions of 5:8, divided into two parts in the ratio of 5:3: the left one, blue in colour, with the emblem from the municipal coat of arms and the right one, divided into seven equal horizontal stripes: four blue and three gold.
City and gmina Strzelno		The municipality's flag is a rectangular flag with proportions of 5:8, divided into three equal horizontal stripes: two red and one white. In the central part of the flag is the municipal coat of arms.

=== Nakło County ===
Municipality	Flag	Description
City and gmina Kcynia		The current version of the municipal flag, designed by Kamil Wójcikowski and Robert Fidura, was established by Resolution No. XII/87/2015 of 27 August 2015. It is a rectangular flag with proportions of 5:8, divided into three horizontal stripes: two red and one white in the ratio of 1:8:1. In the central part of the flag the municipal coat of arms is placed.
City and gmina Mrocza		The municipal flag is a rectangular flag, green in colour, with the municipal coat of arms in the central part of the flag.
City and gmina Nakło nad Notecią		The municipal flag was established in June 1999. It is a rectangular flag, blue in colour, with the municipal coat of arms in the central part of the flag with a white horizontal wavy line underneath.
City and gmina Szubin		The municipal flag was established by Resolution No. XXIII/211/05 of 10 February 2005. It is a rectangular flag with proportions of 5:8, divided from left to right with a white stripe into two parts: the upper red and the lower green. In the white central part is the municipal coat of arms.

=== Radziejów County ===
Municipality	Flag	Description
Gmina Bytoń		The municipal flag was established by Resolution No. XXXV/169/2002 of 10 September 2002. It is a rectangular flag with proportions of 5:8, divided into three vertical stripes: yellow, blue and white in the ratio of 1:2:1.
Gmina Dobre		The municipal flag was established on 18 June 1998. It is a rectangular flag with proportions of 5:8, divided into three vertical stripes: two narrower yellow ones and a blue one. In the central part of the flag is the emblem from the municipal coat of arms.
Gmina Osięciny		The flag of the municipality, designed by Krzysztof Mikulski and Lech-Tadeusz Karczewski, was established by Resolution No. XXI/199/2017 of 12 June 2017. It is a rectangular flag with proportions of 5:8, red in colour, in the central part of the flag is the emblem from the municipal coat of arms.
City and gmina Piotrków Kujawski		The municipal flag, designed by Lech-Tadeusz Karczewski, was established by Resolution No. XXIV/147/2021 of 25 June 2021. It is a rectangular flag with proportions of 5:8, divided into three horizontal stripes: green, white and red in the ratio of 1:4:1. In the central part of the flag the municipal coat of arms is placed.
City of Radziejów		The city's flag is a rectangular flag divided into three horizontal stripes: blue, yellow and red. In the central part of the flag is the coat of arms of the city.
Gmina Radziejów		The municipal flag is a rectangular flag with proportions of 5:8, divided into four vertical stripes: yellow, black, white and red in the ratio of 1:1:1:6.
Gmina Topólka		The municipality's flag, designed by Krzysztof Dorcz, was established on 27 April 2000. It is a rectangular flag with proportions of 5:8, yellow in colour, in the central part of the flag the municipal coat of arms is placed.

=== Rypin County ===
Municipality	Flag	Description
Gmina Brzuze		The municipal flag was established by Resolution No. XLI/238/2022 of 28 October 2022. It is a rectangular flag with proportions 5:8, divided into three horizontal stripes: green, white and blue in the ratio of 1:2:1. In the central part of the flag the municipal coat of arms is placed.
City of Rypin		The city's flag was established on 12 February 1996. It is a rectangular flag, divided into four equal horizontal stripes: blue, white, red and blue.
Gmina Rypin		The municipality's flag was established by Resolution No. XXX/171/13 of 17 September 2013. It is a rectangular flag with proportions 5:8. divided into two equal horizontal stripes: yellow and red. In the central part of the flag is the municipal coat of arms.
Gmina Skrwilno		The municipal flag was established by Resolution No. XI/88/2000 of 30 August 2000. It is a rectangular flag with proportions of 5:8, divided into three vertical stripes: two red and yellow in the ratio of 1:3:1. In the central part of the flag is the municipal coat of arms.
Gmina Wąpielsk		The flag of the municipality was established by Resolution No. XLII/224/17 of 28 July 2017. It is a rectangular flag with proportions of 5:8, divided into three equal horizontal stripes: yellow, red and white. In the central part of the flag the municipal coat of arms is placed.

=== Sępólno County ===
Municipality	Flag	Description
City and gmina Kamień Krajeński		The municipal flag was established by Resolution No. XXXII/253/2010 of 31 March 2010. It is a rectangular flag with proportions 5:8, blue in colour, on the left side of the flag is the emblem from the municipal coat of arms.
City and gmina Sępólno Krajeńskie		The municipality's flag was established by Resolution No. XXXI/271/05 of 25 May 2005. It is a rectangular flag with proportions of 5:8, divided from the right obliquely into two parts: the upper one blue, with the coat of arms of the municipality in canton, and the lower one yellow.
City and gmina Więcbork		The municipality's flag is a rectangular flag with proportions of 5:16, divided into three equal vertical stripes: two blue and one white. In the central part of the flag is the town's coat of arms with the inscription 'Więcbork' above it.

=== Świecie County ===
Municipality	Flag	Description
Gmina Bukowiec		The municipal flag was established by Resolution No. XXIV/199/2005 of 30 August 2005. It is a rectangular flag with proportions 5:8, red in colour, in the central part of the flag the emblem from the municipal coat of arms is placed.
Gmina Dragacz		The municipal flag was established by Resolution No. IV/21/11 of 26 January 2011. It is a rectangular flag with proportions of 5:8, divided into three horizontal stripes: blue, yellow and green in the ratio of 1:3:1.
Gmina Drzycim		The flag of the municipality was established by Resolution No. XXXII/247/2018 of 19 July 2018. It is a rectangular flag with proportions of 5:8, blue in colour, in the central part of the flag the emblem from the municipal coat of arms is placed.
Gmina Lniano		The municipal flag was established by Resolution No. XXI/150/2012 of 27 September 2012. It is a rectangular flag with proportions of 5:8, divided into three horizontal stripes: two blue and one white in the ratio of 1:4:1. In the central part of the flag is the municipal coat of arms.
City and gmina Nowe		The municipal flag was established by Resolution No. XXXI/180/09 of 27 May 2009. It is a rectangular flag with proportions of 5:8, divided into four horizontal stripes: red, white, blue and white. In the central part of the flag is the municipal coat of arms.
City and gmina Pruszcz		The municipal flag was established by Resolution No. XLVI/336/2002 of 10 October 2002. It is a rectangular flag with proportions of 5:8, divided into two equal vertical stripes: white with the municipal coat of arms and green.
City and gmina Świecie		The municipal flag, designed by Mirosław Lorch, was established on 29 August 1996. It is a rectangular flag with proportions 3:5, divided into four horizontal stripes: blue, white, red and white in the ratio of 19:6:6:19. In the central part of the flag the municipal coat of arms is placed.
Gmina Świekatowo		The municipal flag was established by Resolution No. XIV/124/05 of 14 January 2005. It is a rectangular flag with proportions of 5:8, blue in colour, in the central part of the flag the emblem from the municipal coat of arms is placed.
Gmina Warlubie		The municipal flag was established by Resolution No. XXIV/181/05 of 29 November 2005. It is a rectangular flag with proportions of 5:8, blue in colour, in the central part of the flag the emblem from the municipal coat of arms is placed.

=== City of Toruń ===
Flag	Description
	The city's flag was established on 15 April 1999. It is a rectangular flag, divided into two equal horizontal stripes: white and blue. In the central part of the flag is the coat of arms of the city.

=== Toruń County ===
Municipality	Flag	Description
City of Chełmża		The city's flag is a rectangular flag with proportions 5:8, blue in colour, in the lower right corner of the flag is the city's coat of arms.
Gmina Chełmża		The municipal flag is a rectangular flag, divided into two equal horizontal stripes: white and green.
Gmina Czernikowo		Flaga gminy to prostokątny płat tkaniny, podzielony z lewa w skos czarno-żółtym pasem na dwie części: górną białą, z herbem gminy i dolną czerwoną.
Gmina Lubicz		The municipal flag was established by Resolution No. XXXIV/552/2001 of 29 June 2001. It is a rectangular flag with proportions of 5:8, divided into three equal vertical stripes: white, red and blue.
Gmina Łysomice		The flag of the municipality, designed by Jan Wroniszewski and Krzysztof Mikulski, was established by Resolution No. XXII/132/2012 of 27 August 2012. It is a rectangular flag with proportions of 5:8, divided into two horizontal stripes: white and green in the ratio of 4:1. In the central part of the flag is an emblem from the municipal coat of arms.
Gmina Obrowo		The municipal flag was established by Resolution No. XVI/113/2008. It is a rectangular flag with proportions of 5:8, divided into three horizontal stripes: two blue and one yellow in the ratio of 1:3:1. On both stripes the symbols from the municipal coat of arms are placed.
Gmina Wielka Nieszawka		The municipal flag was established by Resolution No. XVII/89/00 of 27 May 2000. It is a rectangular flag with proportions of 5:8, divided into three equal vertical stripes: two black and one white. In the upper left corner of the flag is the municipal coat of arms.
Gmina Zławieś Wielka		The municipal flag was established by Resolution No. XX/231/2002 of 26 April 2002. It is a rectangular flag with proportions of 5:8, divided into two equal vertical stripes: white with the municipal coat of arms and red.

=== Tuchola County ===
Municipality	Flag	Description
Gmina Cekcyn		The municipal flag was established on 12 June 1998. It is a rectangular flag with proportions of 5:8, divided into three equal horizontal stripes: two yellow and one green. In the central part of the flag is the emblem from the municipal coat of arms.
Gmina Kęsowo		The municipal flag, designed by Krzysztof Mikulski and Lech-Tadeusz Karczewski, was established by Resolution No. XXXVI/210/2010 of 11 March 2010. It is a rectangular flag with proportions of 5:8, red in colour, in the central part of which the coat of arms of the municipality was placed.
Gmina Lubiewo		The municipal flag is a rectangular flag, divided into three vertical stripes: two yellow and one red in the ratio of 1:3:1. In the central part of the flag is the municipal coat of arms.
City and gmina Tuchola		The municipality's flag was established by Resolution No. XLI/347/14 of 25 April 2014. It is a rectangular flag in the proportions of 5:8, silver in colour, with a blue cross superimposed on it. In the central part of the flag is the municipal coat of arms.

=== Wąbrzezńo County ===
Municipality	Flag	Description
Gmina Dębowa Łąka		The municipal flag was established by means of Resolution No. 13/06 of 3 May 2006. It is a rectangular flag with proportions of 5:8, divided into two horizontal stripes: green and red in the ratio of 2:1. On the left side of the strip there is the municipal coat of arms.
Gmina Książki		The municipality's flag was established by Resolution No. XLII/212/14 of 29 January 2014. It is a rectangular flag with proportions of 5:8, red in colour, with a silver wedge in its central part. In the centre of the wedge is the municipal coat of arms.
City of Wąbrzeźno		The first version of the city's flag was established on 18 September 1996. The current appearance, designed by Krzysztof Mikulski and Lech-Tadeusz Karczewski, was established by Resolution No. XXXII/205/21 of 8 September 2021. It is a rectangular flag with proportions of 5:8, divided into five horizontal stripes: red, yellow, red, black and red in the ratio of 8:1:1:1. In the upper left corner of the flag is an emblem from the city coat of arms.

=== City of Włocławek ===
Flag	Description
	The city flag is in the form of a pennant, divided into two equal vertical stripes: red and yellow. In the top left corner of the flag is the emblem from the city's coat of arms.

=== Włocławek County ===
Municipality	Flag	Description
City and gmina Brześć Kujawski		The municipal flag, designed by Krzysztof Dorcz, was established by Resolution No. XXXV/292/2021 of 18 November 2021. It is a rectangular flag with proportions of 5:8, divided into three vertical stripes: two red and one white in the ratio of 1:6:1. In the central part of the flag the municipal coat of arms is placed.
City and gmina Chodecz		The municipal flag was established by Resolution No. XIV/88/04 of 25 February 2004. It is a rectangular flag with proportions of 5:8, red in colour, in the central part of the flag the emblem from the municipal coat of arms is placed.
Gmina Choceń		The municipality's flag was established by Resolution No. XIII/100/12 of 23 February 2012. It is a rectangular flag with proportions 5:8, blue in colour, cut diagonally from the right with a white and red chequered pattern. In the upper left corner of the flag is a silver pastoral cross.
Gmina Fabianki		The municipal flag is a rectangular flag, blue in colour, in the central part of the flag the emblem from the municipal coat of arms is placed.
City of Kowal		The municipality's flag is a rectangular flag with proportions of 5:8, divided into three equal horizontal stripes: white, yellow and red. In the central part of the flag it features the municipal coat of arms.
Gmina Lubanie		The municipal flag was established by Resolution No. VI/38/07 of 29 June 2007. It is a rectangular flag with proportions of 5:8, divided into four equal horizontal stripes: yellow, red, white and blue. In the central part of the flag the municipal coat of arms may be displayed.
City and gmina Lubień Kujawski		The municipal flag is a rectangular flag with proportions of 5:9, divided into two horizontal stripes: yellow and green in a ratio of 2:1. In the central part of the upper stripe is the municipal coat of arms.
City and gmina Lubraniec		The city flag is a rectangular flag with proportions of 5:8, divided into three horizontal stripes: green, brown and red in a ratio of 2:1:2. In the upper left corner of the flag is the municipal coat of arms.
Gmina Włocławek		The municipal flag was established by resolution No. XXVI/181/20 of 15 September 2020. It is a rectangular flag with proportions of 5:8, divided into five horizontal stripes: red, yellow, black, white and red in the ratio of 5:1:1:1:5.

=== Żnin County ===
Municipality	Flag	Description
City and gmina Barcin		The municipal flag is a rectangular flag with proportions 5:8, white in colour, in the central part of the flag the municipal coat of arms is placed.
City and gmina Gąsawa		The municipal flag was established by Resolution No. XVIII/121/08 of 30 December 2008. It is a rectangular flag with proportions of 5:8, divided into two equal horizontal stripes: red and white. In the central part of the flag the municipal coat of arms is placed.
City and gmina Janowiec Wielkopolski		The municipal flag is a rectangular flag with proportions of 5:8, divided into three equal horizontal stripes: white, yellow and blue. In the central part of the flag is the municipal coat of arms.
City and gmina Łabiszyn		The municipal flag was established by Resolution No. XIII/121/12 of 28 March 2012. It is a rectangular flag with proportions 5:8, blue in colour, in the central part of the flag the emblem from the municipal coat of arms is placed.
Gmina Rogowo		The municipal flag was established by Resolution No. XXVII/169/09 of 16 March 2009. It is a rectangular flag with proportions 5:8, red in colour, in the central part of the flag the emblem from the municipal coat of arms is placed.
City and gmina Żnin		The municipal flag was established by Resolution No. V/37/2003 of 28 March 2003. It is a rectangular flag with proportions of 5:8, blue in colour, in the central part of the flag the emblem from the municipal coat of arms is placed.

== See also ==
- Flags of counties in the Kuyavian–Pomeranian Voivodeship
