= Żołędowo, Kuyavian-Pomeranian Voivodeship =

Żołędowo
- Village
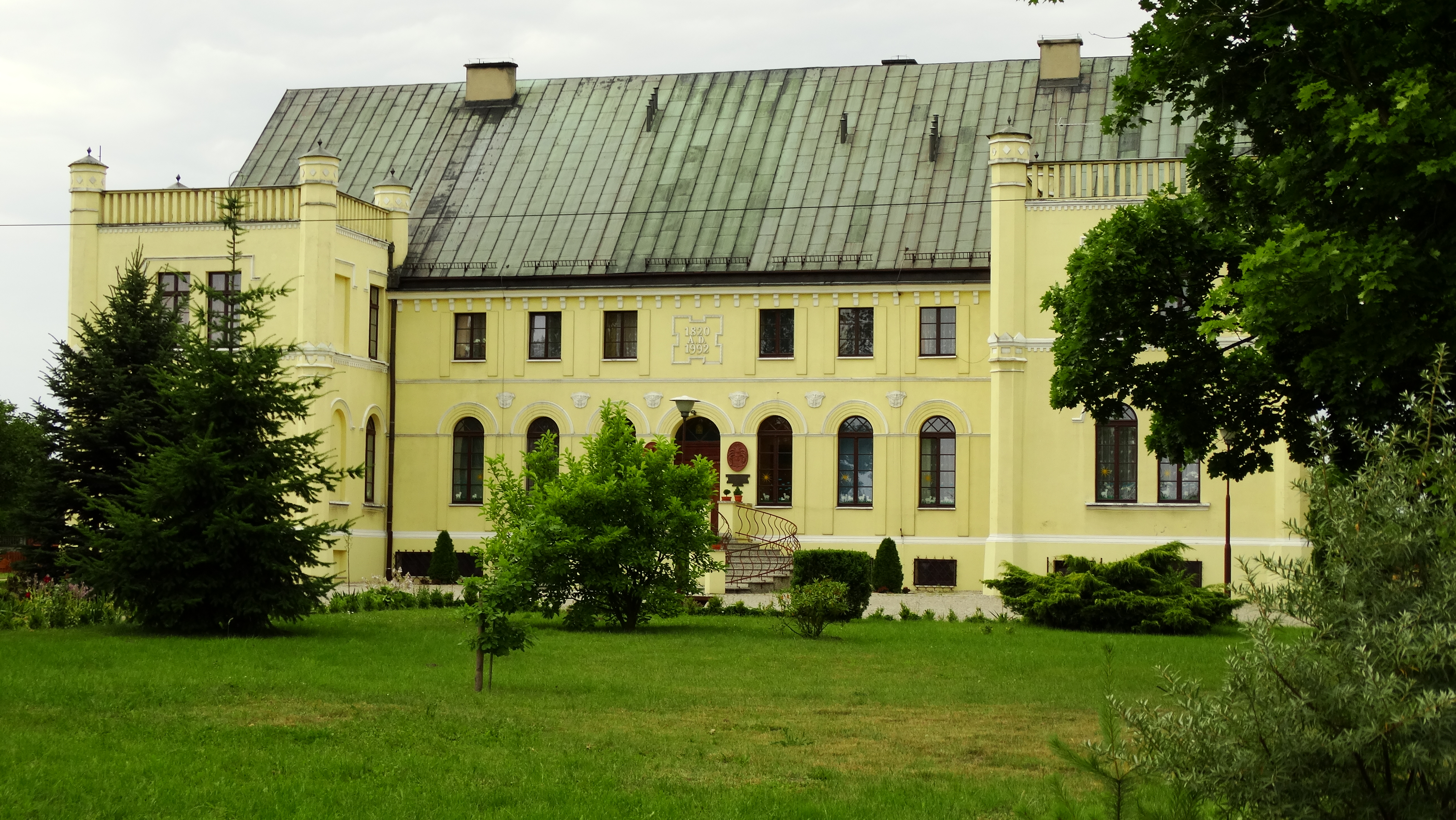
- Karłowski Palace in Żołędowo

- Location within Poland
- Coordinates: 53°13′N 18°4′E
- Country: Poland
- Voivodeship: Kuyavian-Pomeranian
- County: Bydgoszcz
- Gmina: Osielsko

Population
  - Total: 920
- Time zone: UTC+1 (CET)
  - Summer (DST): UTC+2 (CEST)
- Vehicle registration: CBY
- Primary airport: Bydgoszcz Ignacy Jan Paderewski Airport

Żołędowo [ʐɔwɛnˈdɔvɔ] is a village in the administrative district of Gmina Osielsko, within Bydgoszcz County, Kuyavian-Pomeranian Voivodeship, in north-central Poland. It is located in the historic region of Kuyavia.

The historic landmarks of Żołędowo are the Karłowski Palace and the Exaltation of the Holy Cross church.

== History ==
Żołędowo was a private village of Polish nobility, administratively located in the Bydgoszcz County in the Inowrocław Voivodeship in the Greater Poland Province of the Kingdom of Poland.

During the German occupation (World War II), in 1939, the occupiers carried out arrests of local Poles, who were then murdered by the German Einsatzkommando 16 near Otorowo as part of the Intelligenzaktion. In 1944, the Germans burned the bodies of the victims in attempt to cover up the crime.

== Gallery ==
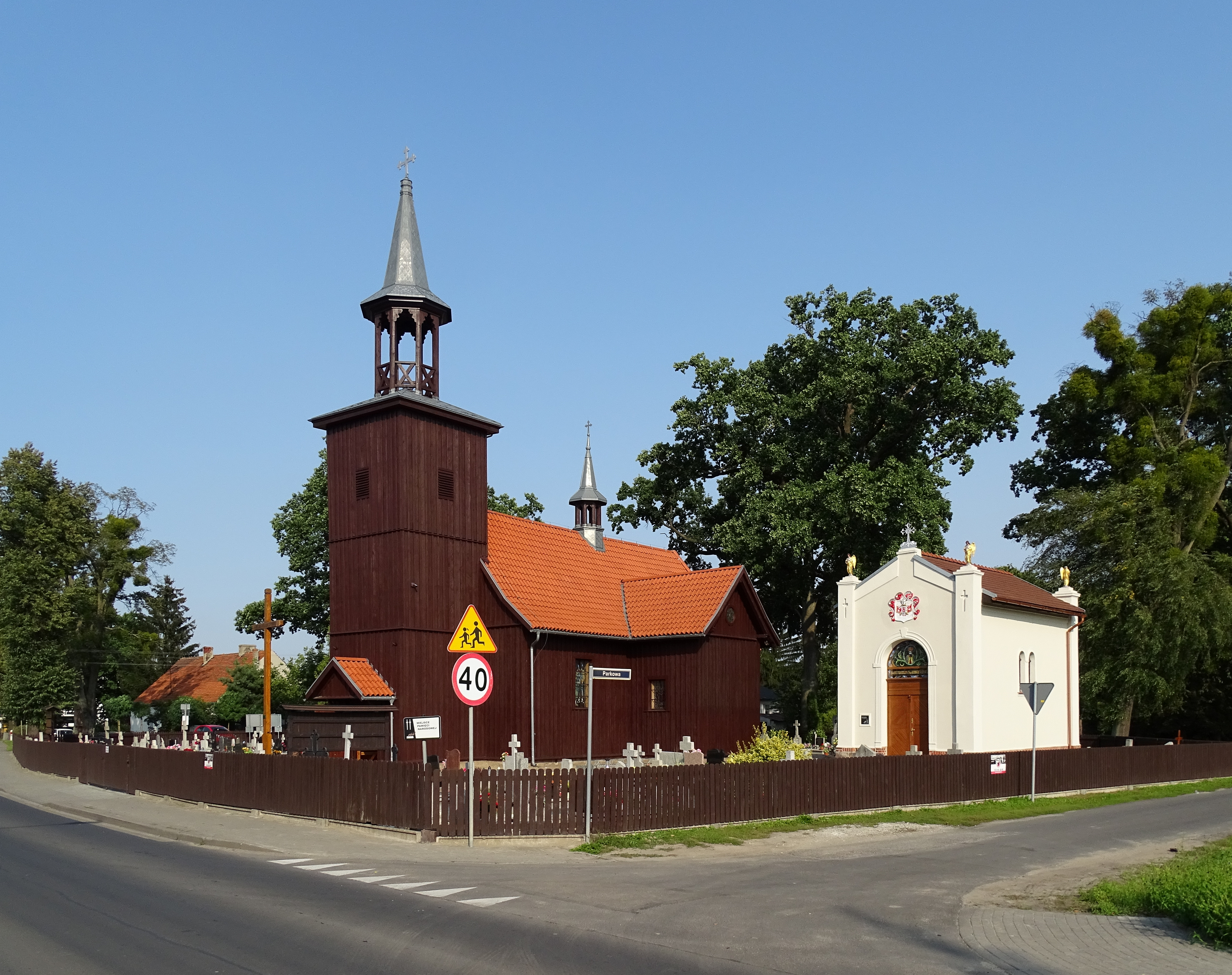
Exaltation of the Holy Cross church

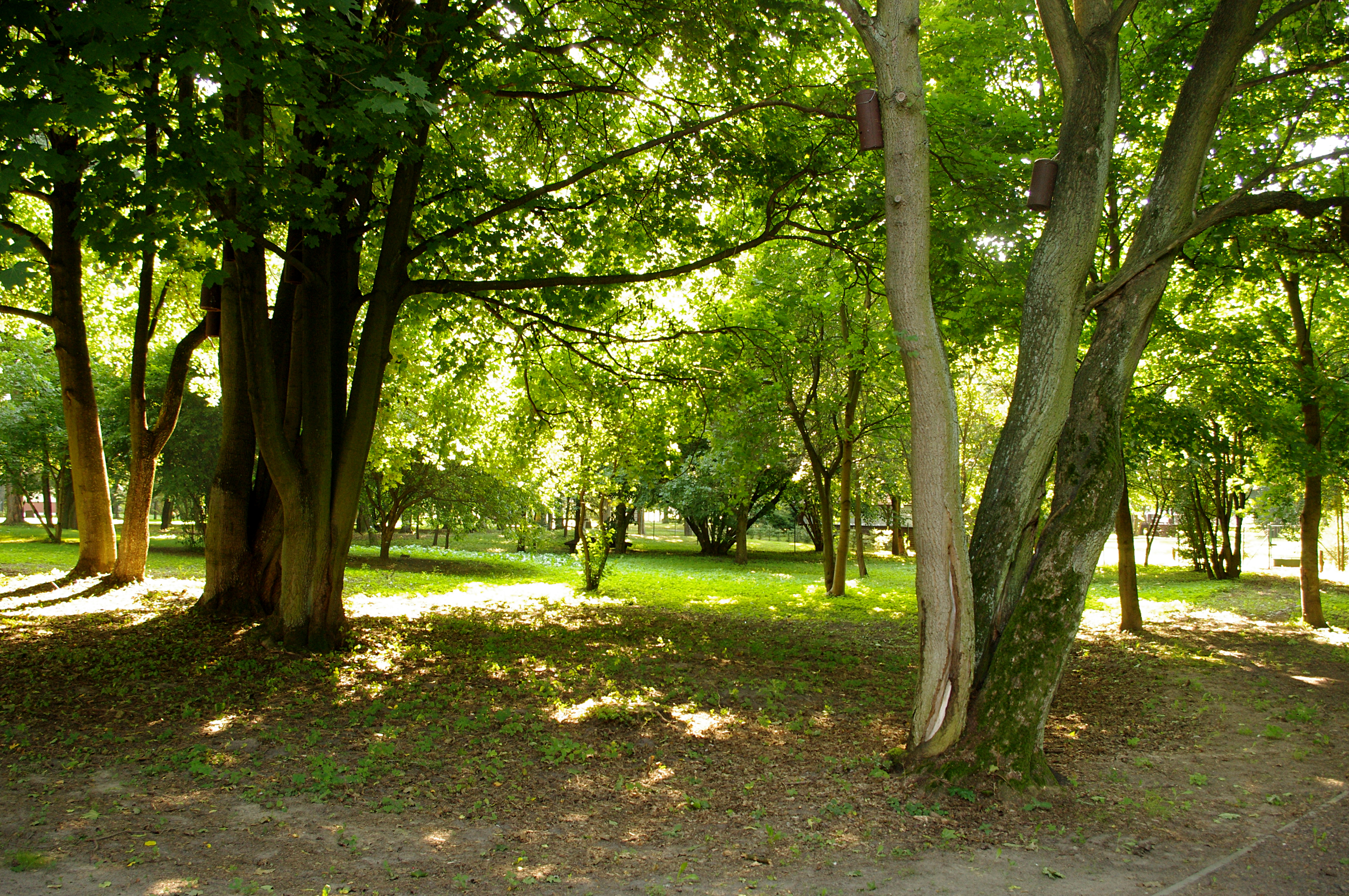
Park

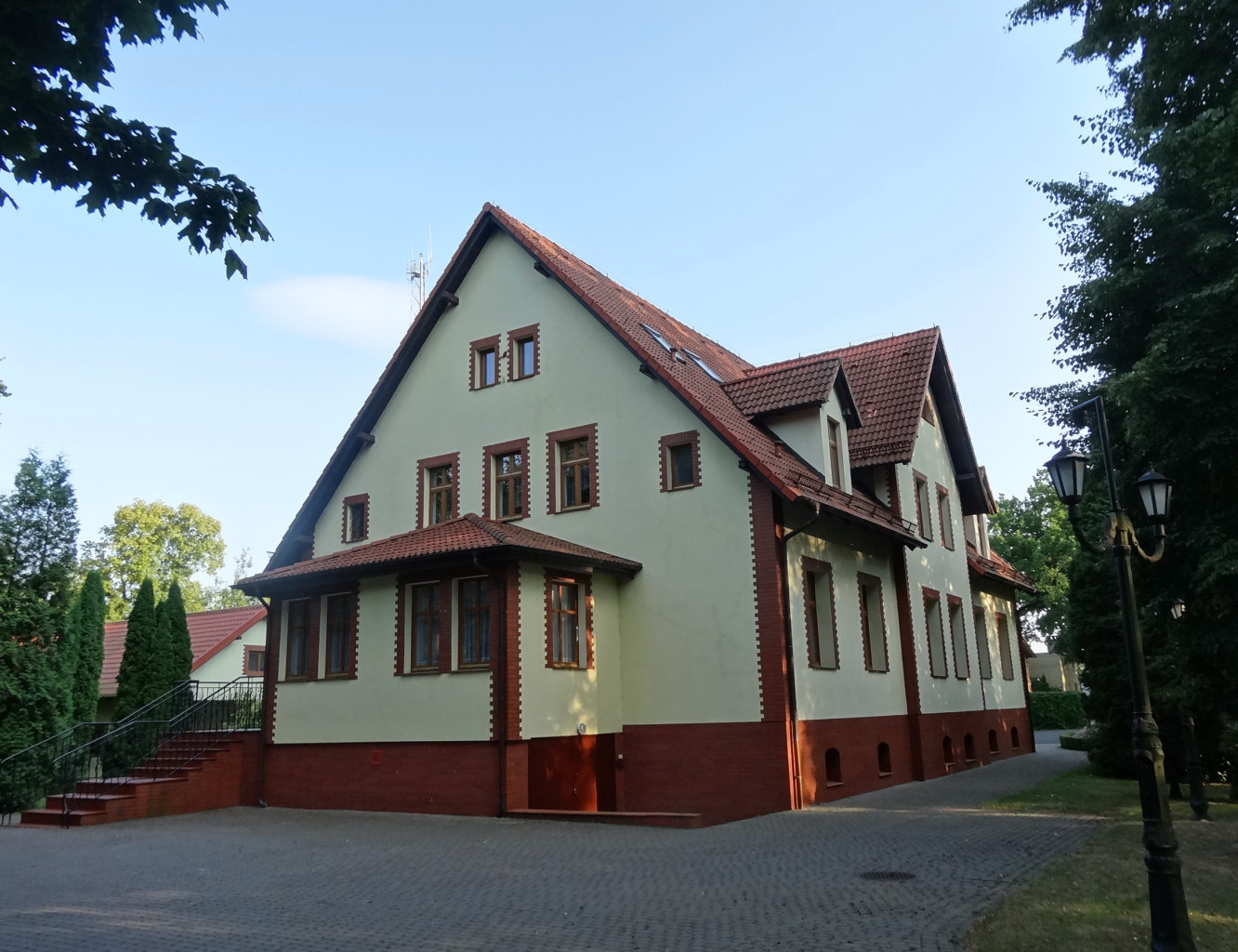
Żołędowo Forest Inspectorate

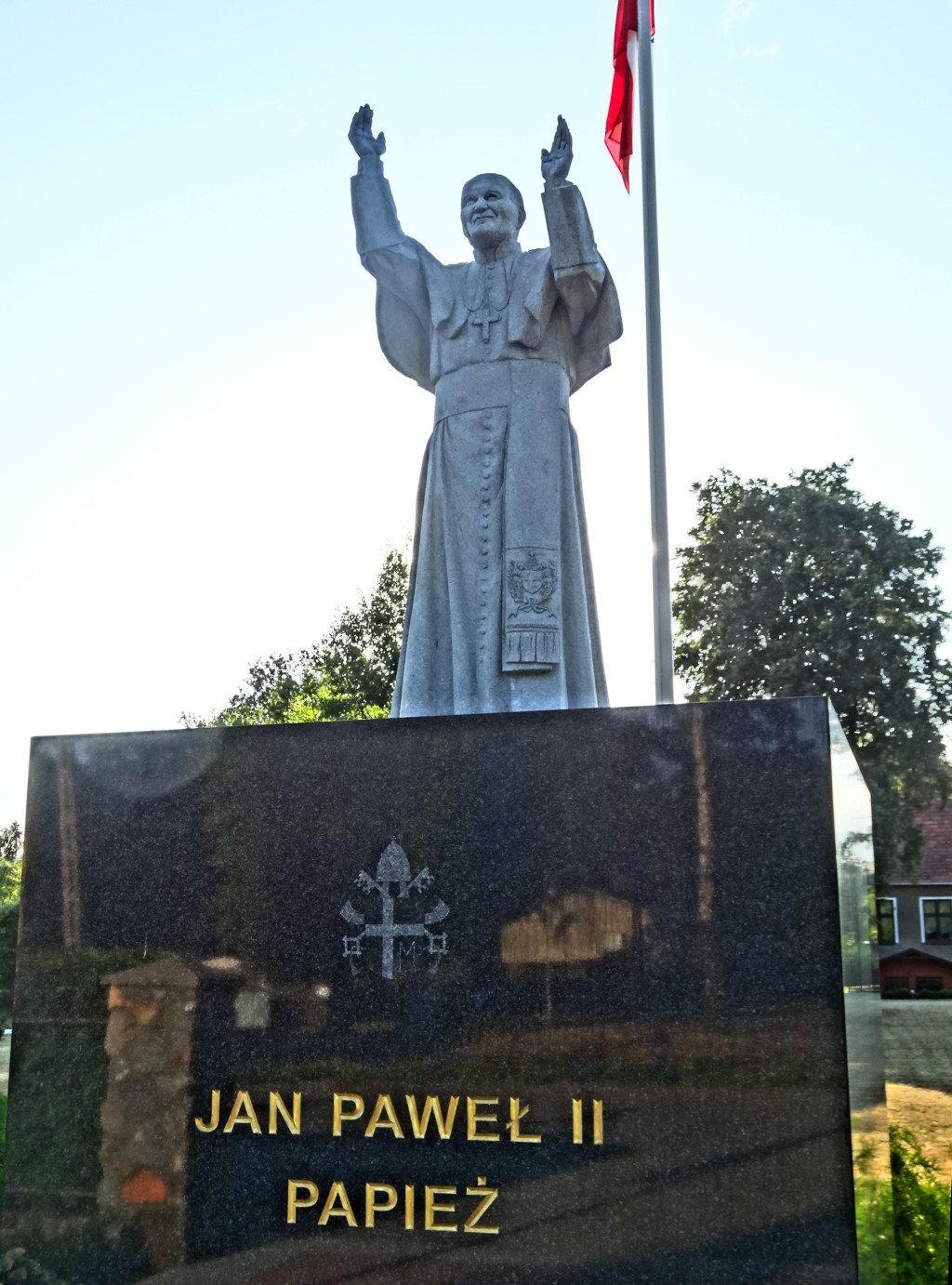
Pope John Paul II monument
