= Chrosna =

Chrosna may refer to the following places in Poland:

- Chrośna, Kuyavian-Pomeranian Voivodeship
- Chrosna, Lesser Poland Voivodeship
- Chrosna, Masovian Voivodeship
