= Osielsko =

- Village
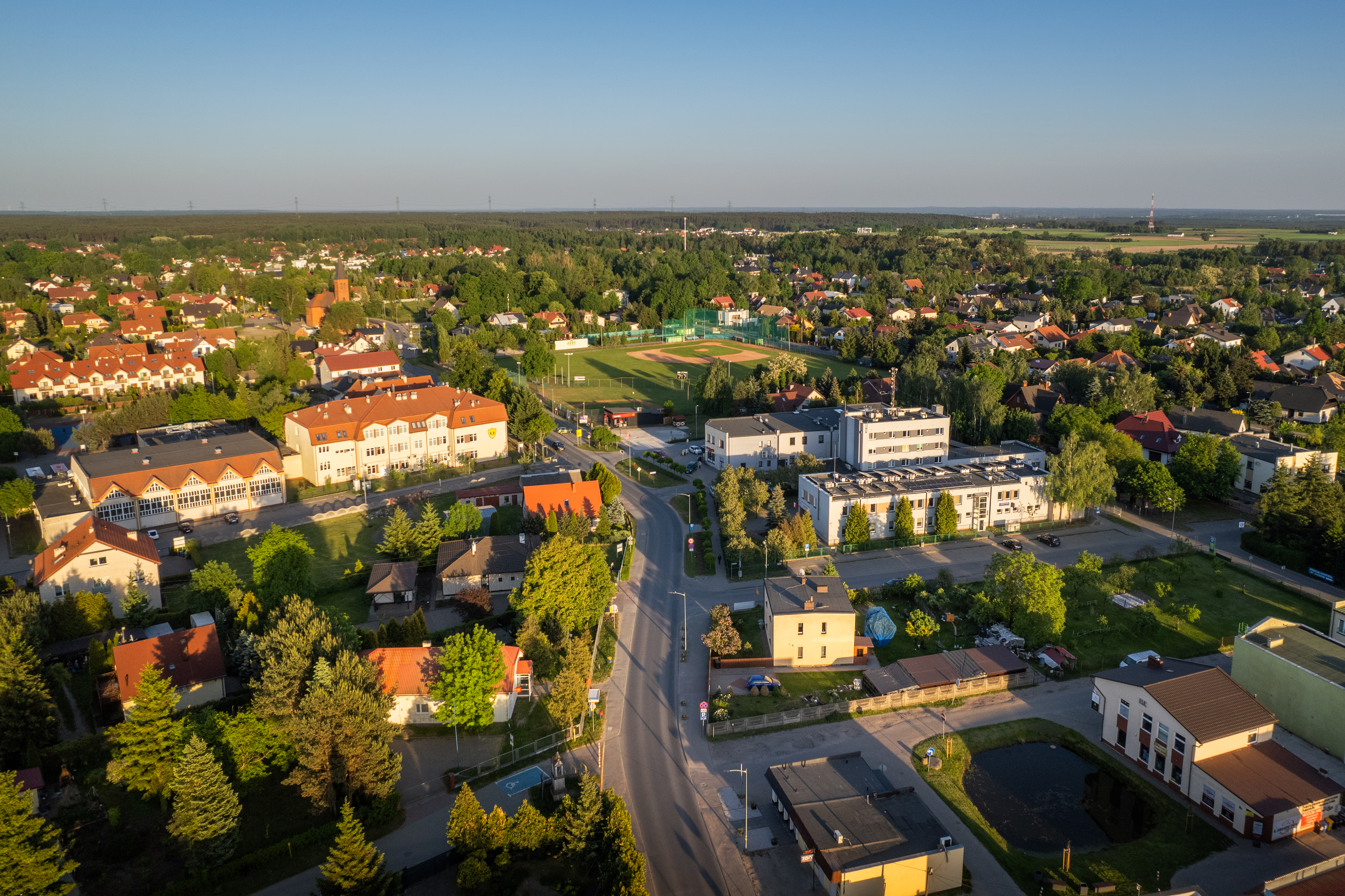
- Drone view along Centralna Street

- Location within Poland
- Coordinates: 53°11′N 18°4′E
- Country: Poland
- Voivodeship: Kuyavian-Pomeranian
- County: Bydgoszcz
- Gmina: Osielsko
- Population: 3,482
- Time zone: UTC+1 (CET)
  - Summer (DST): UTC+2 (CEST)
- Vehicle registration: CBY

Osielsko [ɔˈɕɛlskɔ] is a village in Bydgoszcz County, Kuyavian-Pomeranian Voivodeship, in north-central Poland. It is the seat of the gmina (administrative district) called Gmina Osielsko. It is located in the historic region of Kuyavia.

== History ==
Osielsko is mentioned in Ptolemy's Geography as Askaukalis, settlement of the Goths. In the Middle Ages, the region was inhabited by the Polish tribes, and in the 10th century it became part of the emerging Polish state. In 1065, it was granted to the Mogilno monastery. In 1155, Osielsk was mentioned in a document of Polish monarch Bolesław IV the Curly.

It was administratively located in the Inowrocław Voivodeship in the Greater Poland Province of the Polish Crown until it was annexed by Prussia in the late-18th-century Partitions of Poland. In 1807, it was regained by Poles and included within the short-lived Duchy of Warsaw, and after its dissolution, in 1815 it was reannexed by Prussia, and from 1871 it was part of the German Empire, within which it administratively belonged to Kreis Bromberg in the Province of West Prussia. After World War I, Poland regained independence and control of the village. Osielsko was part of Poznań Voivodeship from 1919 to 1938 and of Pomeranian Voivodeship from 1938 to 1939.

During the German occupation (World War II), Osielsko was one of the sites of executions of Poles, carried out by the Germans in 1939 as part of the Intelligenzaktion. Local Poles were also murdered by the German Einsatzkommando 16 near Otorowo, also as part of the Intelligenzaktion.

== Sports ==
The most notable local sports club is baseball team Dęby Osielsko. It competes in the Ekstraliga Baseball (Poland's top division), which it won in 2004.

== Gallery ==
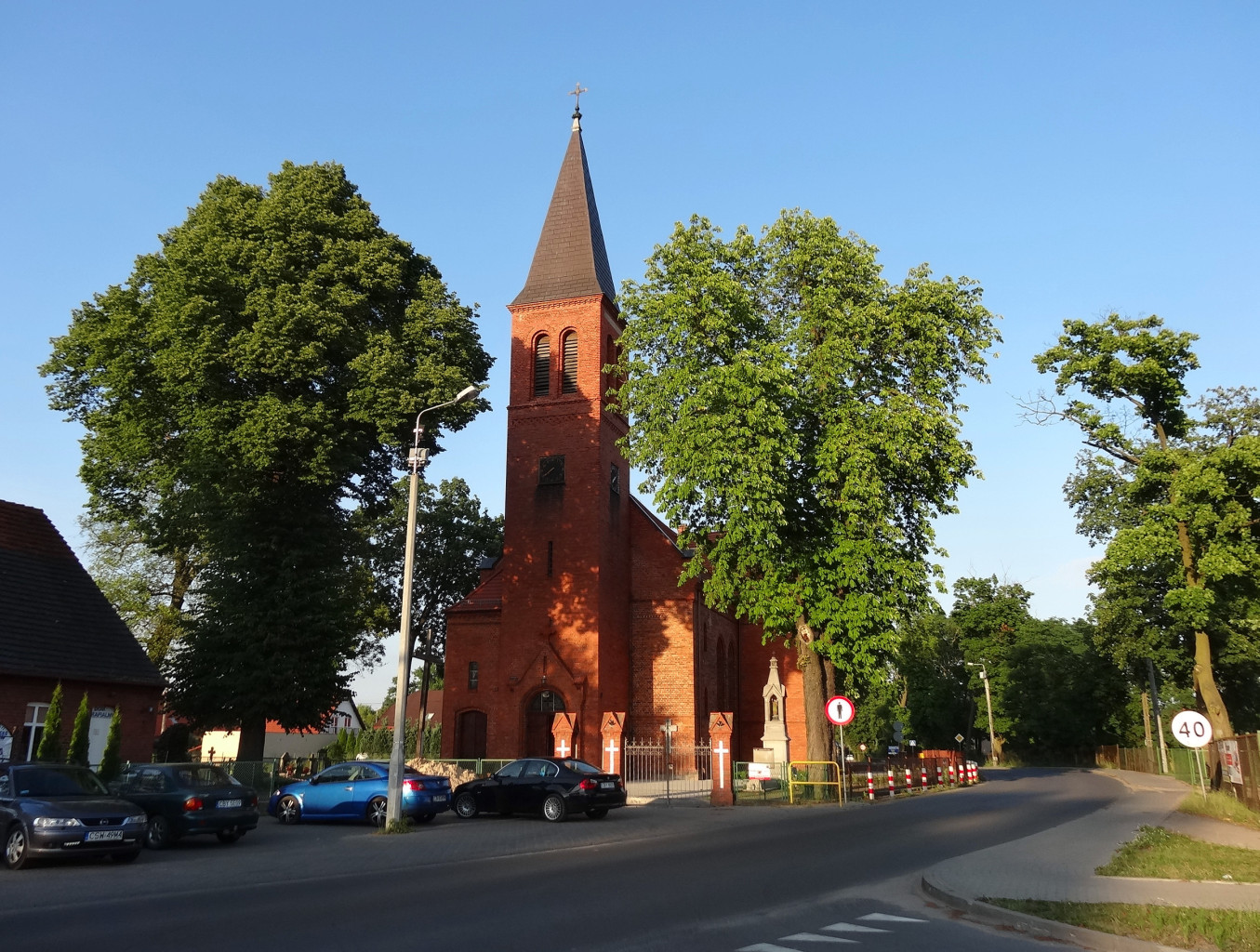
Church of the Nativity of the Virgin Mary in Osielsko

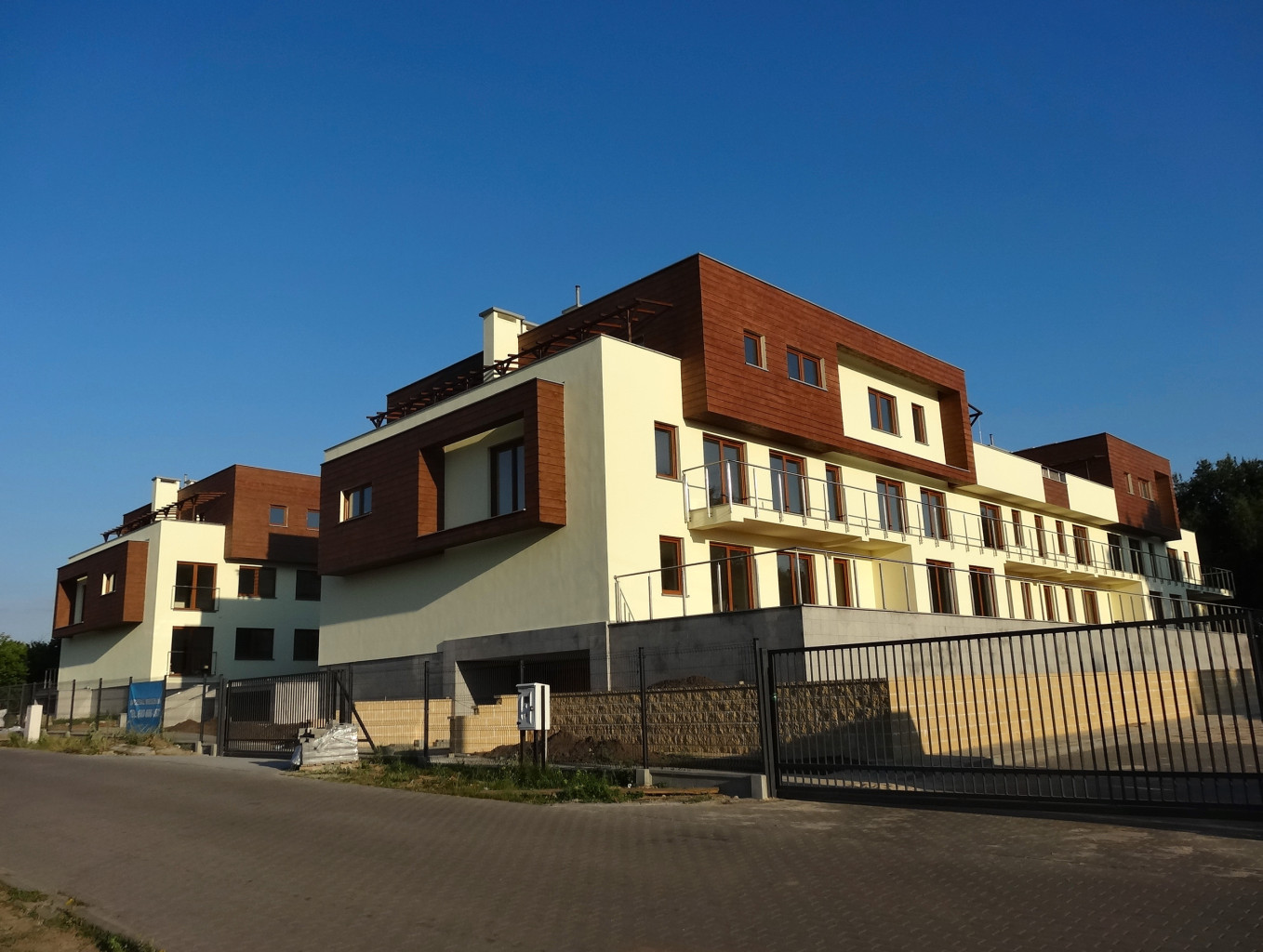
Modern apartment buildings

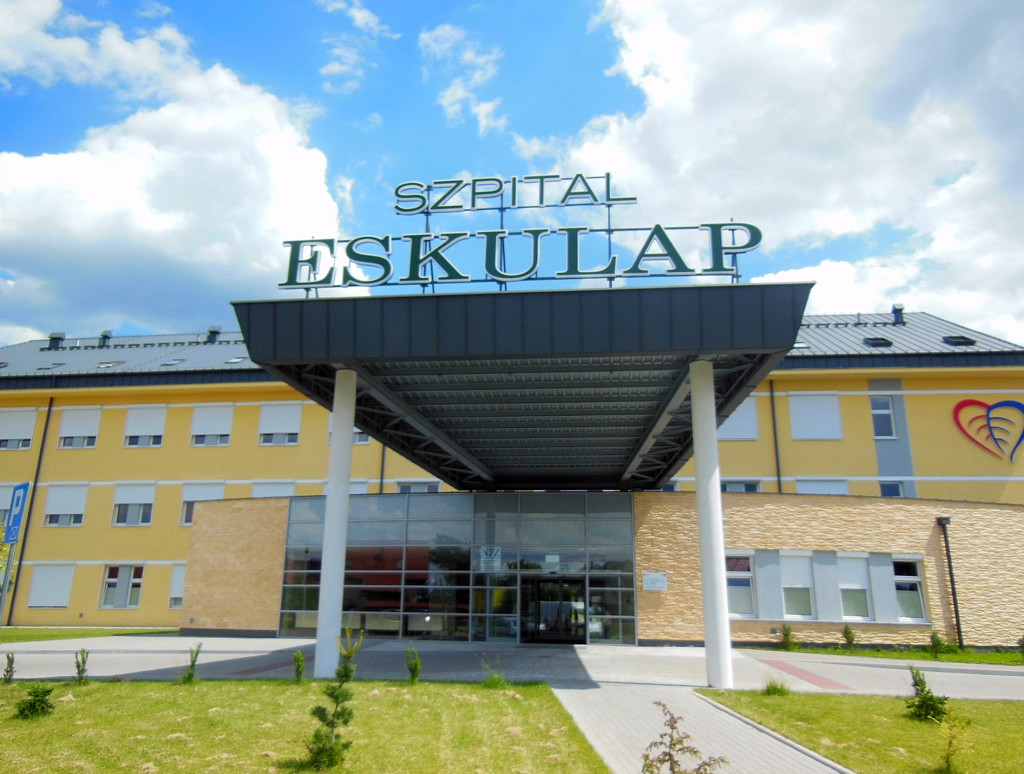
Hospital

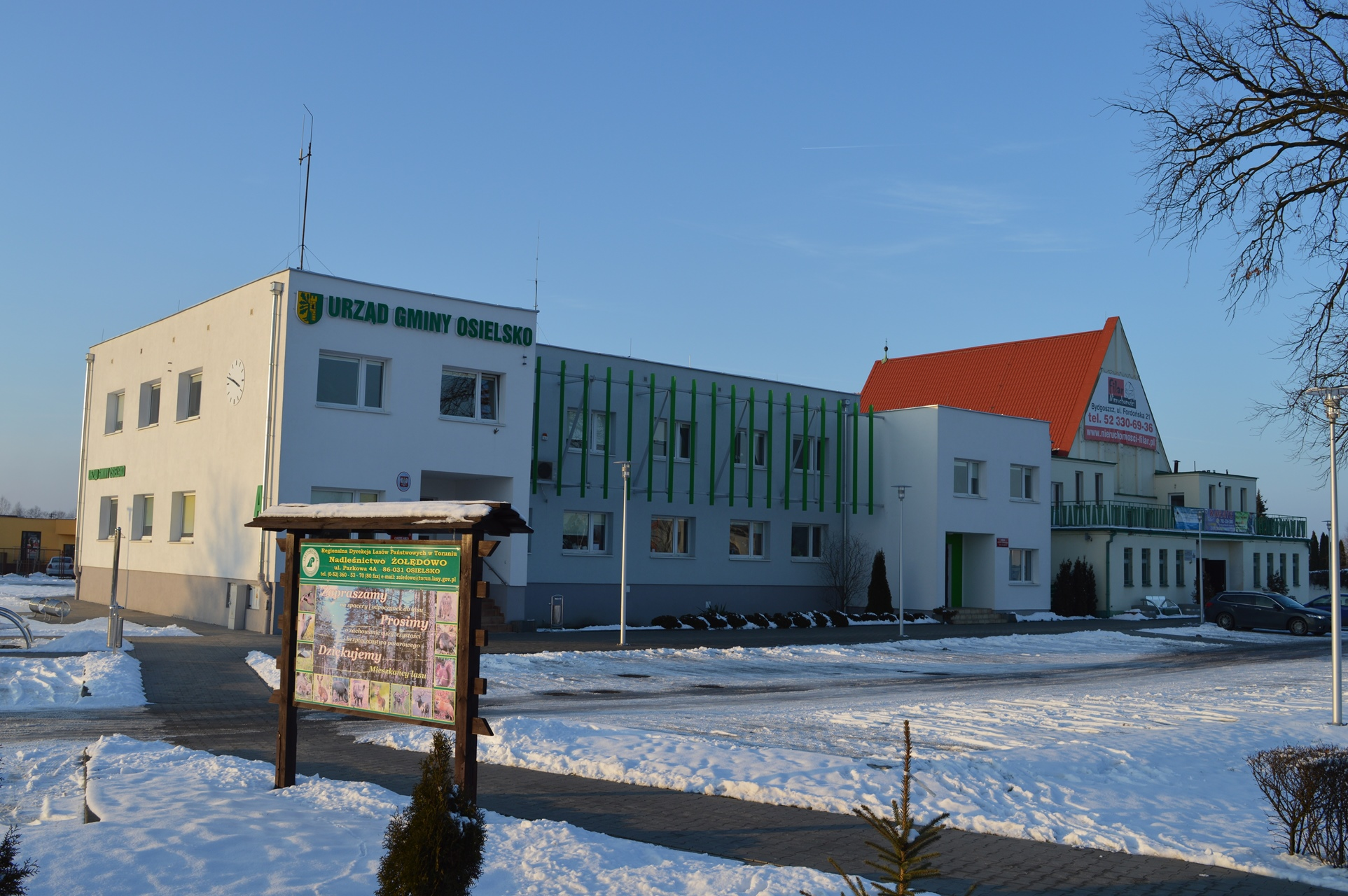
Gmina Office

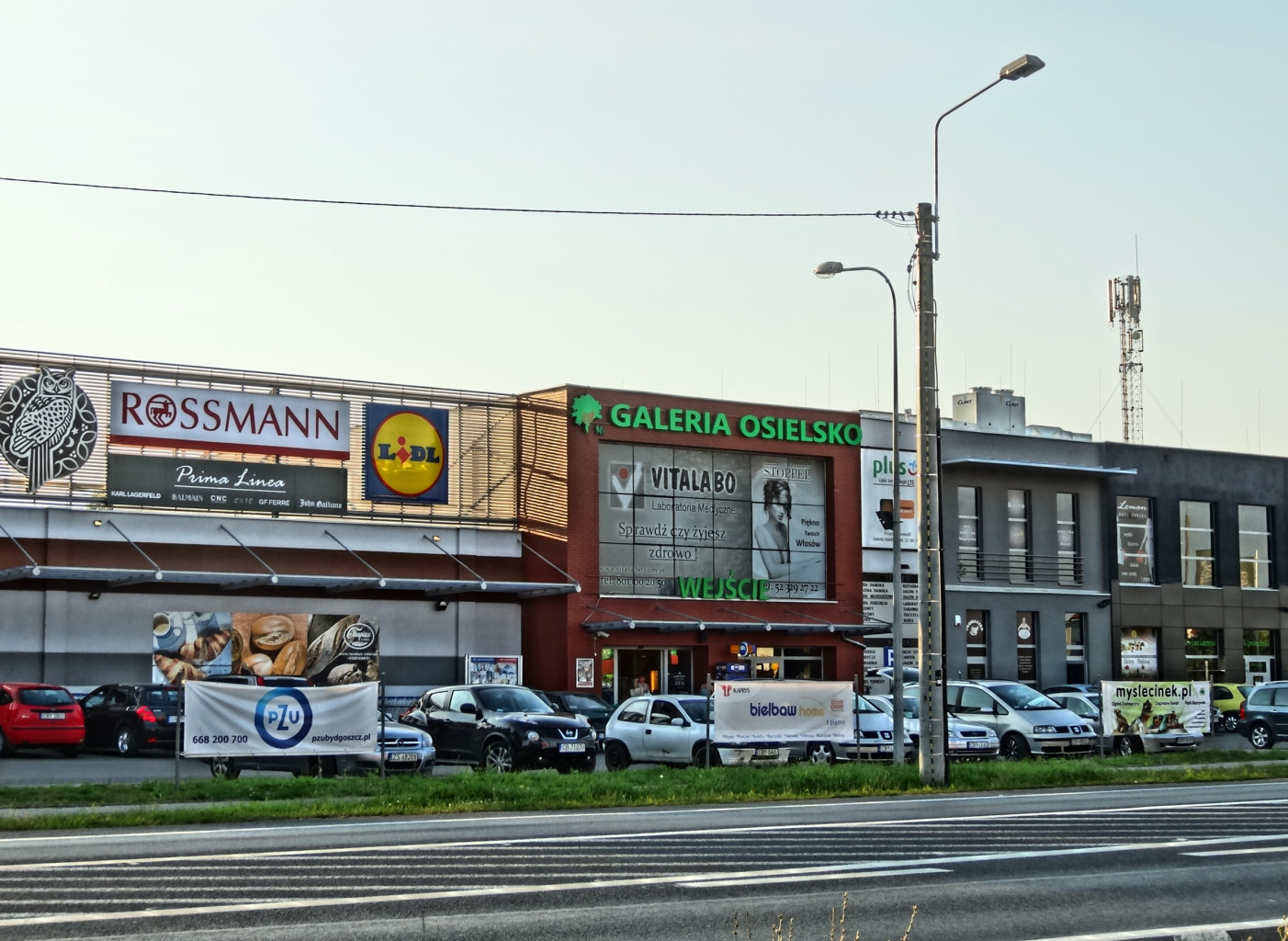
Shopping mall
