= List of county flags in Kuyavian–Pomeranian Voivodeship =

The flag of Kuyavian–Pomeranian Voivodeship.

The following list includes flags of the counties of the Kuyavian–Pomeranian Voivodeship, Poland. A flag is a sheet of fabric of a specific shape, colour and meaning, attached to a spar or mast. It may also include the coat of arms or emblem of the administrative unit it represents. In Poland, territorial units (municipal, city, and county councils) may establish flags in accordance with the Act of 21 December 1978 on badges and uniforms.” In its original version, the act only allowed territorial units to establish coats of arms. It was not until the "Act of 29 December 1998 amending certain acts in connection with the implementation of the state system reform" that the right for voivodeships, counties, and municipalities to establish a flag as the symbol of their territorial unit was officially confirmed. This change benefited powiats, which were reinstated in 1999.

In 2024, 18 out of 19 poviats (Grudziądz County is the only one without a flag) and all four city counties had their own flag in the Kuyavian–Pomeranian Voivodeship.

== List of county flags ==
=== City counties ===
County	Flag	Description
Bydgoszcz		The city's flag was established by Resolution No. XLIV/951/2005 of 30 March 2005. It is a rectangular flag with proportions of 5:8, divided into three equal horizontal stripes: white, red and blue. In the central part of the flag is the coat of arms of the city.
Grudziądz		The city's flag was established on 23 November 1990. It is a rectangular piece of cloth with proportions of 5:8, divided into three equal horizontal stripes: yellow, red and white.
Toruń		The city's flag was established on 15 April 1999. It is a rectangular flag, divided into two equal horizontal stripes: white and blue. In the central part of the flag is the coat of arms of the city.
Włocławek		The city flag is in the form of a pennant, divided into two equal vertical stripes: red and yellow. In the top left corner is the emblem from the city's coat of arms.

=== Land counties ===
County	Flag	Description
Aleksandrów County		The county flag was established by Resolution No. XVIII/215/2001 of 26 April 2001. It is a rectangular flag with proportions of 5:8, divided into two equal vertical stripes: white and red. In the central part of the flag is the emblem from the county coat of arms.
Brodnica County		The first version of the county flag was established by Resolution No. XVIII/96/2000 of 26 October 2000; the current one, designed by Krzysztof Mikulski and Lech-Tadeusz Karczewski, was established by Resolution No. XLVIII/213/2014 of 22 April 2014. It is a rectangular flag with proportions of 5:8, divided into two equal parts: the left one, white in colour, with the emblem from the county coat of arms, and the right one, divided into five equal stripes: three white and two red.
Bydgoszcz County		The county flag was established by resolution No. 156/XXVIII/01 of 5 July 2001. It is a rectangular flag with proportions of 5:8, blue in colour, in the central part of the flag is the county coat of arms.
Chełmno County		The flag of the district was established by the resolution No XXVI/134/2001 of 25 April 2001. It is a rectangular flag, red in colour, in the central part of the flag the emblem from the county coat of arms is placed.
Golub-Dobrzyń County		The county flag was established by Resolution No. XVII/156/2000 of 28 December 2000. It is a rectangular flag with proportions 5:8, divided into three horizontal stripes: two red and one white in the ratio of 1:3:1. In the central part of the flag the county coat of arms is placed.
Inowrocław County		The county flag was established by Resolution No. XX/203/2008 of 10 July 2008. It is a rectangular flag with proportions of 5:8, divided into three horizontal stripes: black, yellow and red. In the central part of the flag is the emblem from the county coat of arms.
Lipno County		The flag of the district was established by the resolution No. XXVI/178/2005 of 27 June 2005. It is a rectangular flag with proportions 5:8, divided into three vertical stripes: two yellow and one red in the ratio of 1:2:1. In the central part of the flag is an emblem from the district's coat of arms.
Mogilno County		The flag of the district was established by the resolution No. XLIV/261/02 of 30 August 2002. It is a rectangular flag with proportions 5:8, divided into two parts in the ratio of 3.5:1.5: the upper yellow one, with the emblem from the county coat of arms and the lower one, consisting of a white and red chequered pattern.
Nakło County		The flag of the district was established by resolution No. XLI/343/2002 of 27 June 2002. It is a rectangular flag with proportions 5:8, red in colour, in the central part of the flag the emblem from the county coat of arms is placed.
Radziejów County		Flaga powiatu została ustanowiona uchwałą nr XXXVII/174/2002 z 28 lutego 2002. Jest to prostokątny płat tkaniny o proporcjach 5:8, podzielony w skos przez żółty pas na dwie równe części: lewą górną czerwoną, z herbem powiatu i prawą dolną błękitną.
Rypin County		The flag of the county, designed by Krzysztof Mikulski and Lech-Tadeusz Karczewski, was established by means of resolution no XXII/146/2000 of 9 November 2000. It is a rectangular flag with proportions 5:8, divided into three vertical stripes: two white and one blue in the ratio 1:2:1. In the central part of the flag is the emblem from the county coat of arms.
Sępólno County		The county flag was established by Resolution No. XIII/85/2000 of 21 January 2000. It is a rectangular flag with proportions of 5:10, divided in a Scandinavian cross into four parts: two white and two blue (the canton is white).
Świecie County		The county flag was established by Resolution No. XXVIII/145/2001 of 30 May 2001. It is a rectangular flag with proportions of 5:8, divided into a 12-field white and red chequered pattern (the canton is white). In the centre of the left-hand side of the flag is the county coat of arms.
Toruń County		The flag of the county, designed by Jan Wroniszewski, Andrzej Mikulski and Lech-Tadeusz Karczewski, was established by means of resolution no XXVI/216/2002 of 6 March 2002. It is a rectangular flag with proportions of 5:8, divided into three vertical stripes: two red and one yellow in the ratio of 1:2:1. In the central part of the flag is the county coat of arms.
Tuchola County		The county flag, designed by Jan Wroniszewski and Lech-Tadeusz Karczewski, was established by Resolution No. XXIX/161/2000 of 29 December 2000. It is a rectangular flag with proportions of 5:8, divided into two equal vertical stripes: white and red, both separated by black stripes. In the central part of the flag is the county coat of arms.
Wąbrzeźno County		The county flag, designed by Jan Wroniszewski and Lech-Tadeusz Karczewski, was established by Resolution No. XIX/98/2000 of 27 September 2000. It is a rectangular flag with proportions of 5:8, divided diagonally by a white stripe into two equal parts: the upper left one is black, with the county coat of arms, and the lower right one is red.
Włocławek County		The county flag was established by Resolution No. XXII/173/2000 of 8 December 2000. It is a rectangular flag with proportions of 5:8, divided crosswise into four parts: yellow, black, white and red. In the central part of the flag is the county coat of arms.
Żnin County		The county flag, designed by Jan Wroniszewski, Andrzej Mikulski and Lech-Tadeusz Karczewski, was established by resolution No. XXXV/321/2002 of 29 April 2002. It is a rectangular flag with proportions of 5:8, divided into two equal horizontal stripes: white and blue. In the central part there is the county coat of arms.

== See also ==
- Flags of municipalities in the Kuyavian–Pomeranian Voivodeship
