= Makowiska, Bydgoszcz County =

Makowiska
- Village
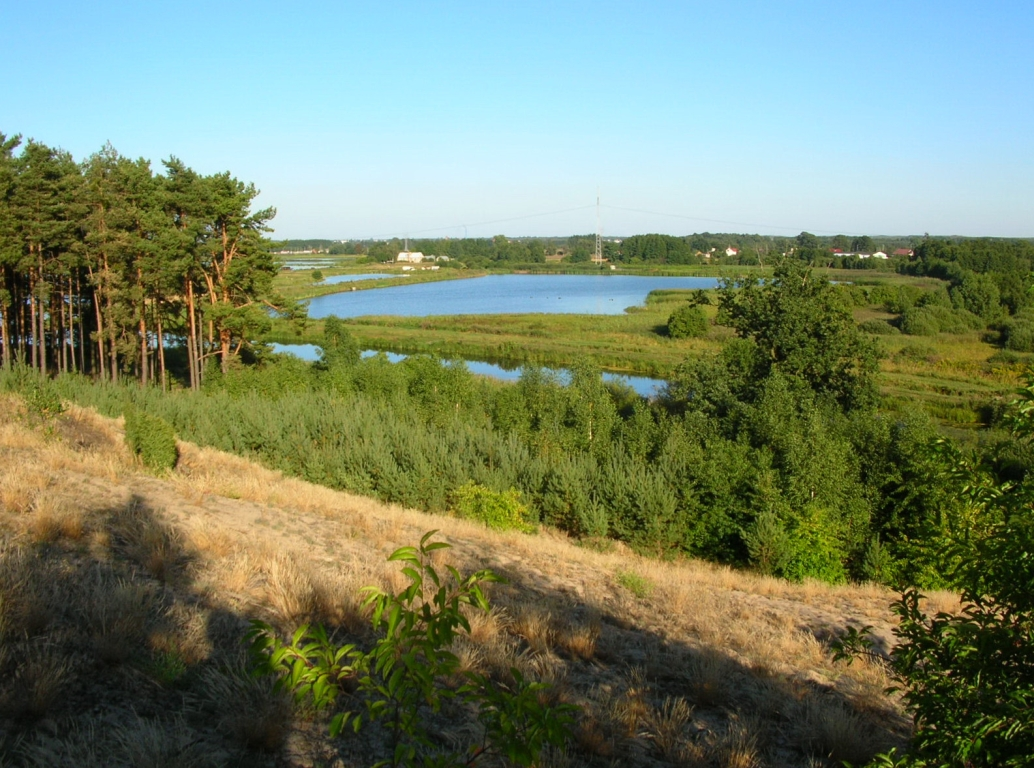
- Łęgnowska Valley. A view from an inland dune to the lowland near Makowiska

- Location within Poland
- Coordinates: 53°04′10″N 18°09′51″E
- Country: Poland
- Voivodeship: Kuyavian-Pomeranian
- County: Bydgoszcz
- Gmina: Solec Kujawski
- Time zone: UTC+1 (CET)
  - Summer (DST): UTC+2 (CEST)
- Vehicle registration: CBY

Makowiska [makɔˈviska] is a village in the administrative district of Gmina Solec Kujawski, within Bydgoszcz County, Kuyavian-Pomeranian Voivodeship, in north-central Poland.

During the German occupation of Poland (World War II), the Germans established and operated a forced labour subcamp of the German military prison in Grudziądz.
