= Niemcz =

- Village
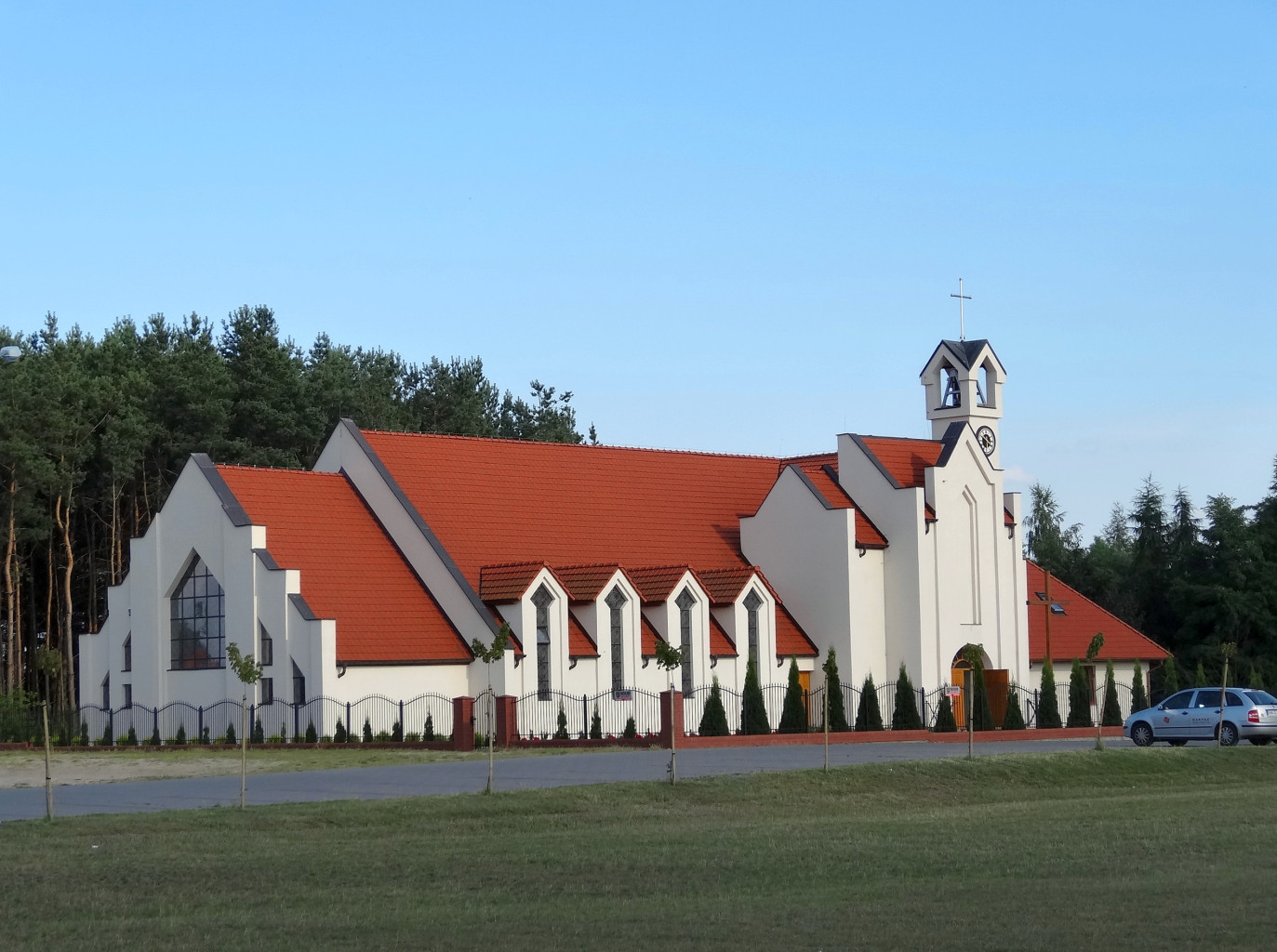
- Church of the Virgin Mary Help of Christians

- Location within Poland
- Coordinates: 53°11′N 18°2′E
- Country: Poland
- Voivodeship: Kuyavian-Pomeranian
- County: Bydgoszcz
- Gmina: Osielsko
- Elevation: 90 m (300 ft)

Population
  - Total: 2,940

Niemcz [ɲɛmt͡ʂ] is a village in the administrative district of Gmina Osielsko, within Bydgoszcz County, Kuyavian-Pomeranian Voivodeship, in north-central Poland.
