= Przyłubie, Kuyavian-Pomeranian Voivodeship =

Przyłubie
- Village
- Location within Poland
- Coordinates: 53°4′N 18°18′E
- Country: Poland
- Voivodeship: Kuyavian-Pomeranian
- County: Bydgoszcz
- Gmina: Solec Kujawski

Przyłubie [pʂɨˈwubjɛ] is a village in the administrative district of Gmina Solec Kujawski, within Bydgoszcz County, Kuyavian-Pomeranian Voivodeship, in north-central Poland.
