= Jagodowo, Kuyavian-Pomeranian Voivodeship =

Jagodowo
- Village
- Location within Poland
- Coordinates: 53°12′20″N 18°02′26″E
- Country: Poland
- Voivodeship: Kuyavian-Pomeranian
- County: Bydgoszcz
- Gmina: Osielsko
- Population: 47

Jagodowo [jaɡɔˈdɔvɔ] is a village in the administrative district of Gmina Osielsko, within Bydgoszcz County, Kuyavian-Pomeranian Voivodeship, in north-central Poland.
