= Jarużyn-Kolonia =

- Village
- Location within Poland
- Coordinates: 53°11′00″N 18°09′00″E
- Country: Poland
- Voivodeship: Kuyavian-Pomeranian
- County: Bydgoszcz
- Gmina: Osielsko
- Population: 126

Jarużyn-Kolonia [jaˈruʐɨn kɔˈlɔɲa] is a village in the administrative district of Gmina Osielsko, within Bydgoszcz County, Kuyavian-Pomeranian Voivodeship, in north-central Poland.
