= Wilcze, Gmina Osielsko =

Wilcze
- Village
- Location within Poland
- Coordinates: 53°12′N 18°7′E
- Country: Poland
- Voivodeship: Kuyavian-Pomeranian
- County: Bydgoszcz
- Gmina: Osielsko
- Elevation: 95 m (312 ft)

Wilcze [ˈvilt͡ʂɛ] is a village in the administrative district of Gmina Osielsko, within Bydgoszcz County, Kuyavian-Pomeranian Voivodeship, in north-central Poland.
