= Strzelce Leśne =

- Village
- Location within Poland
- Coordinates: 53°14′31″N 18°03′28″E
- Country: Poland
- Voivodeship: Kuyavian-Pomeranian
- County: Bydgoszcz
- Gmina: Osielsko
- Population: 8

Strzelce Leśne [ˈstʂɛlt͡sɛ ˈlɛɕnɛ] is a village in the administrative district of Gmina Osielsko, within Bydgoszcz County, Kuyavian-Pomeranian Voivodeship, in north-central Poland.
