= Bożenkowo =

- Village
- Location within Poland
- Coordinates: 53°13′N 17°58′E
- Country: Poland
- Voivodeship: Kuyavian-Pomeranian
- County: Bydgoszcz
- Gmina: Osielsko
- Population: 395

Bożenkowo [bɔʐɛŋˈkɔvɔ] is a village in the administrative district of Gmina Osielsko, within Bydgoszcz County, Kuyavian-Pomeranian Voivodeship, in north-central Poland.
