= Niwy, Bydgoszcz County =

Niwy
- Village
- Location within Poland
- Coordinates: 53°12′N 18°6′E
- Country: Poland
- Voivodeship: Kuyavian-Pomeranian
- County: Bydgoszcz
- Gmina: Osielsko

Niwy [ˈnivɨ] is a village in the administrative district of Gmina Osielsko, within Bydgoszcz County, Kuyavian-Pomeranian Voivodeship, in north-central Poland.
