= Gmina Solec Kujawski =

Gmina Solec Kujawski Solec Kujawski Commune
- Gmina
- Flag Coat of arms

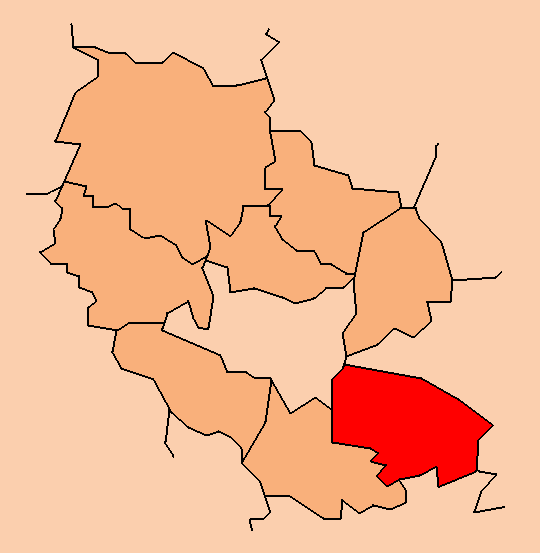
- Location within the county
- Coordinates (Solec Kujawski): 53°5′N 18°14′E
- Country: Poland
- Voivodeship: Kuyavian-Pomeranian
- County: Bydgoszcz County
- Seat: Solec Kujawski

Area
  - Total: 175.35 km^{2} (67.70 sq mi)

Population (2006)
  - Total: 16,067
  - Density: 91.628/km^{2} (237.32/sq mi)
  - Urban: 15,060
  - Rural: 1,007
- Website: http://www.soleckujawski.pl/

Gmina Solec Kujawski is an urban-rural gmina (administrative district) in Bydgoszcz County, Kuyavian-Pomeranian Voivodeship, in north-central Poland. Its seat is the town of Solec Kujawski, which lies approximately 17 kilometres (11 mi) east of Bydgoszcz and 27 km (17 mi) west of Toruń.

The gmina covers an area of 175.35 square kilometres (67.7 sq mi), and as of 2006 its total population is 16,067 (out of which the population of Solec Kujawski amounts to 15,060, and the population of the rural part of the gmina is 1,007).

== Villages ==
Apart from the town of Solec Kujawski, Gmina Solec Kujawski contains the villages and settlements of Chrośna, Makowiska, Otorowo and Przyłubie.

== Neighbouring gminas ==
Gmina Solec Kujawski is bordered by the city of Bydgoszcz and by the gminas of Nowa Wieś Wielka, Rojewo, Wielka Nieszawka and Zławieś Wielka.
