= Solec Kujawski =

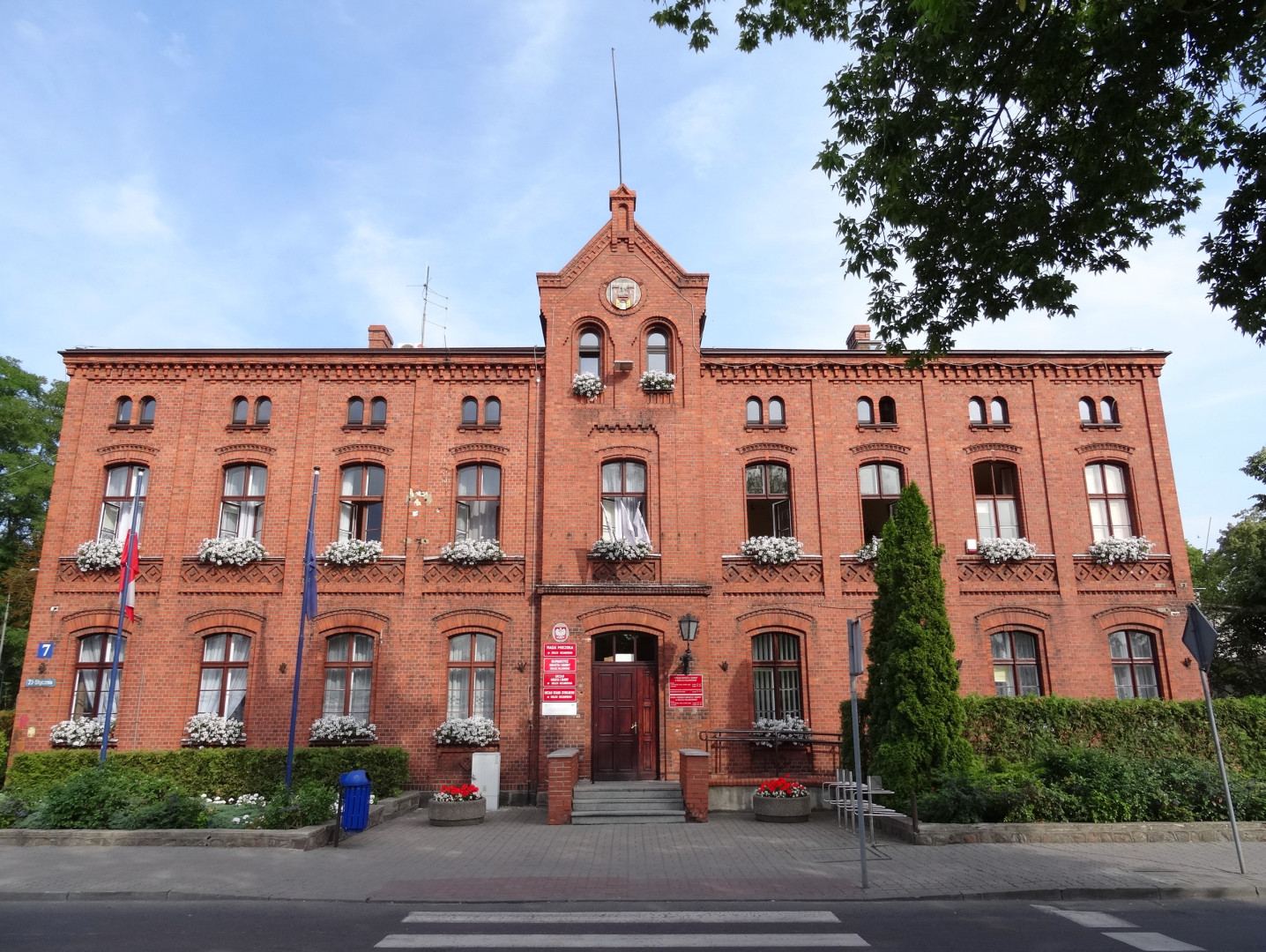
- Town hall

- Flag Coat of arms

- Location within Poland
- Coordinates: 53°5′N 18°14′E
- Country: Poland
- Voivodeship: Kuyavian-Pomeranian
- County: Bydgoszcz
- Gmina: Solec Kujawski
- First mentioned: 1263
- Town rights: 1325

Area
  - Total: 18.68 km^{2} (7.21 sq mi)

Population (2023)
  - Total: 15 249
  - Density: 0.80/km^{2} (2.1/sq mi)
- Time zone: UTC+1 (CET)
  - Summer (DST): UTC+2 (CEST)
- Postal code: 86-050
- Vehicle registration: CBY
- Website: http://www.soleckujawski.pl

Solec Kujawski (Polish pronunciation: [ˈsɔlɛt͡s kuˈjafskʲi]; German: Schulitz) is a town in north-central Poland with 15,505 inhabitants, located in Bydgoszcz County in the Kuyavian-Pomeranian Voivodeship. It is situated within the historic region of Kuyavia, around 14 kilometres (9 mi) southeast of Bydgoszcz. The town features Saint Stanislaus in its coat of arms.

== Urban parts ==
- Makowiska
- Otorowo
- Przyłubie
- Solec Kujawski - Town
- Wypaleniska

== History ==
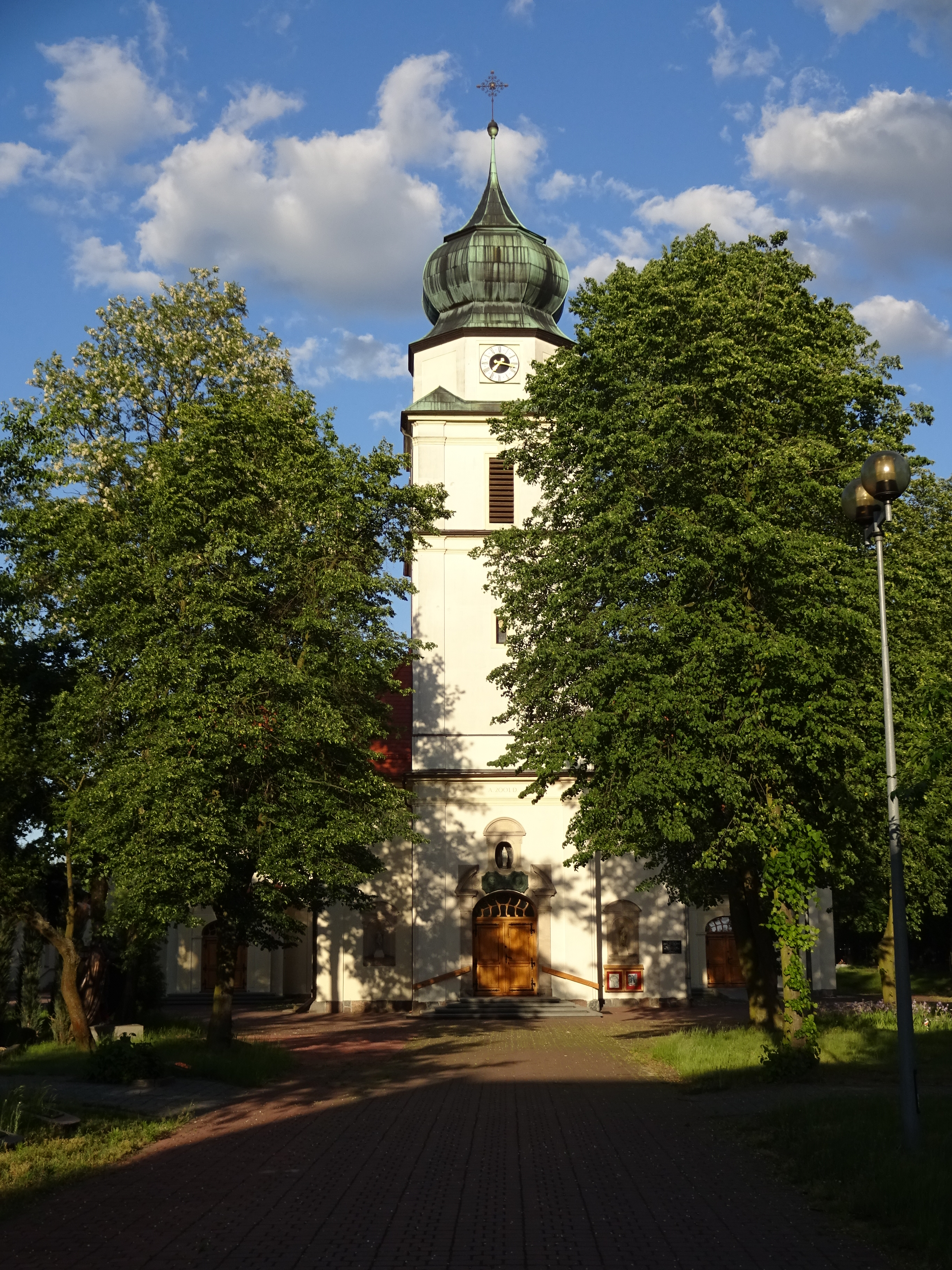
Saint Stanislaus church

The oldest known mention of Solec dates back to 1263, when it was part of the Duchy of Kuyavia within fragmented Piast-ruled Poland. From 1267 it was part of the Polish Duchy of Inowrocław, which in the 14th century was transformed into the Inowrocław Voivodeship of the Kingdom of Poland, which soon became part of the larger Greater Poland Province. In 1325 Duke Przemysł of Inowrocław vested Solec with town rights, which were confirmed by various Polish kings in the following centuries. It was a royal town in the Bydgoszcz County.

In the First Partition of Poland in 1772, the town was annexed by Prussia, which introduced Germanisation policies, confiscated Polish estates and limited Polish education. In 1807 Solec was regained by Poles and included within the short-lived Duchy of Warsaw, and in 1815 it was re-annexed by Prussia, initially as part of the semi-autonomous Grand Duchy of Poznań. After the unsuccessful Polish November Uprising of 1830–1831, Germanisation policies intensified, and in 1832 the Prussians completely removed the Polish language from offices. After World War I, in 1918, Poland regained independence, and the Greater Poland Uprising broke out, which goal was to reunite the region and town with Poland. A battle was fought nearby, and the town was eventually reintegrated with Poland.

Just before the outbreak of World War II, the Poles were preparing for the German invasion, while the local German minority members were preparing to carry out crimes against Poles. Local Germans carried out acts of sabotage against the Polish Army even before the German army entered the town on September 7, 1939, and afterwards they were organized into the Selbstschutz whose task was to exterminate Poles. During the German invasion of Poland, Wehrmacht soldiers and local German minority members murdered 44 people from the town already on September 14. Some of the victims were brutally beaten with rifles (up to the point that they broke apart). The town was then occupied by Germany until 1945. 42 Poles from Solec were executed by the Germans in October and early November 1939 in various places in the town. Some Poles were dragged out of their homes at night by the Selbstschutz and shot in the municipal park. Others were imprisoned by the Selbstschutz, beaten unconscious and murdered on the spot or at the local market. On the outskirts of the town, the Selbstschutz murdered at least 50 Poles, who hailed from Pomerania. The town was subjected to harsh Germanisation policies, Polish schools were closed down, and the usage of the Polish language was forbidden. The Germans destroyed both the memorial and the tombstone of Polish insurgents of 1918–1919. About 1,000 Poles were expelled from Solec to the General Government, and some were also deported to Nazi concentration camps. Jan Mąkowski, local Catholic parish priest in the 1920s, was imprisoned in the Stutthof and Sachsenhausen concentration camps, and killed in the latter in 1940. The Germans brought English, Italian, French and Russian prisoners of war to the town as forced labour.

In the final stages of the war Solec was restored to Poland. The memorial and the tombstone of Polish insurgents of 1918–1919 were rebuilt, and a new monument, which also commemorates the fallen in World War II, was erected in 1999.

== Points of interest ==
The dinosaur park JuraPark Solec is located in the town. The Duke Przemysł Museum of Solec (Muzeum Solca im. księcia Przemysła) is the local historic museum. South of Solec Kujawski there is the longwave-transmitter Solec Kujawski.

== Sports ==
The local football team is Unia Solec Kujawski. It competes in the lower leagues.

== Gallery ==
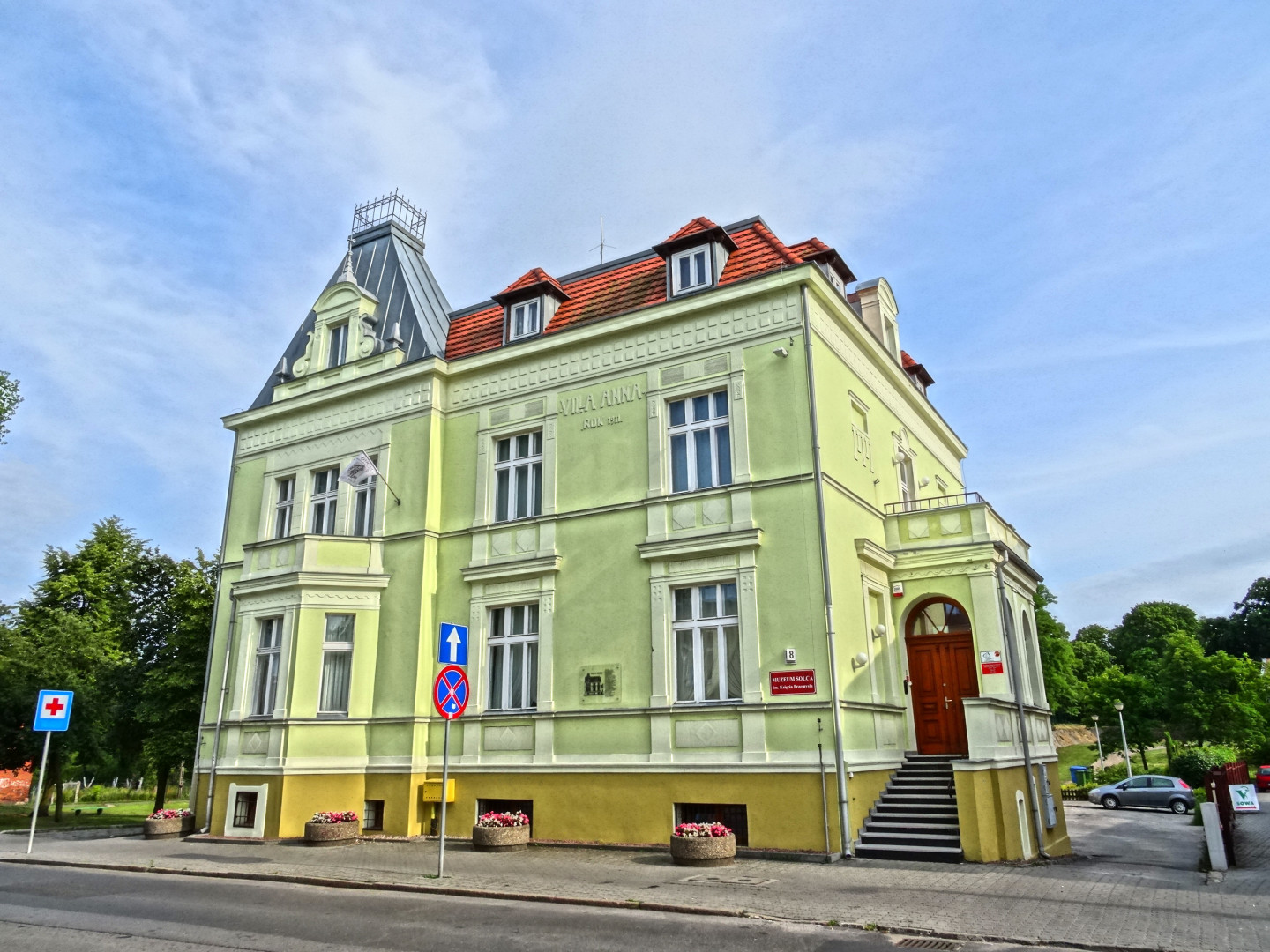
Museum of Solec

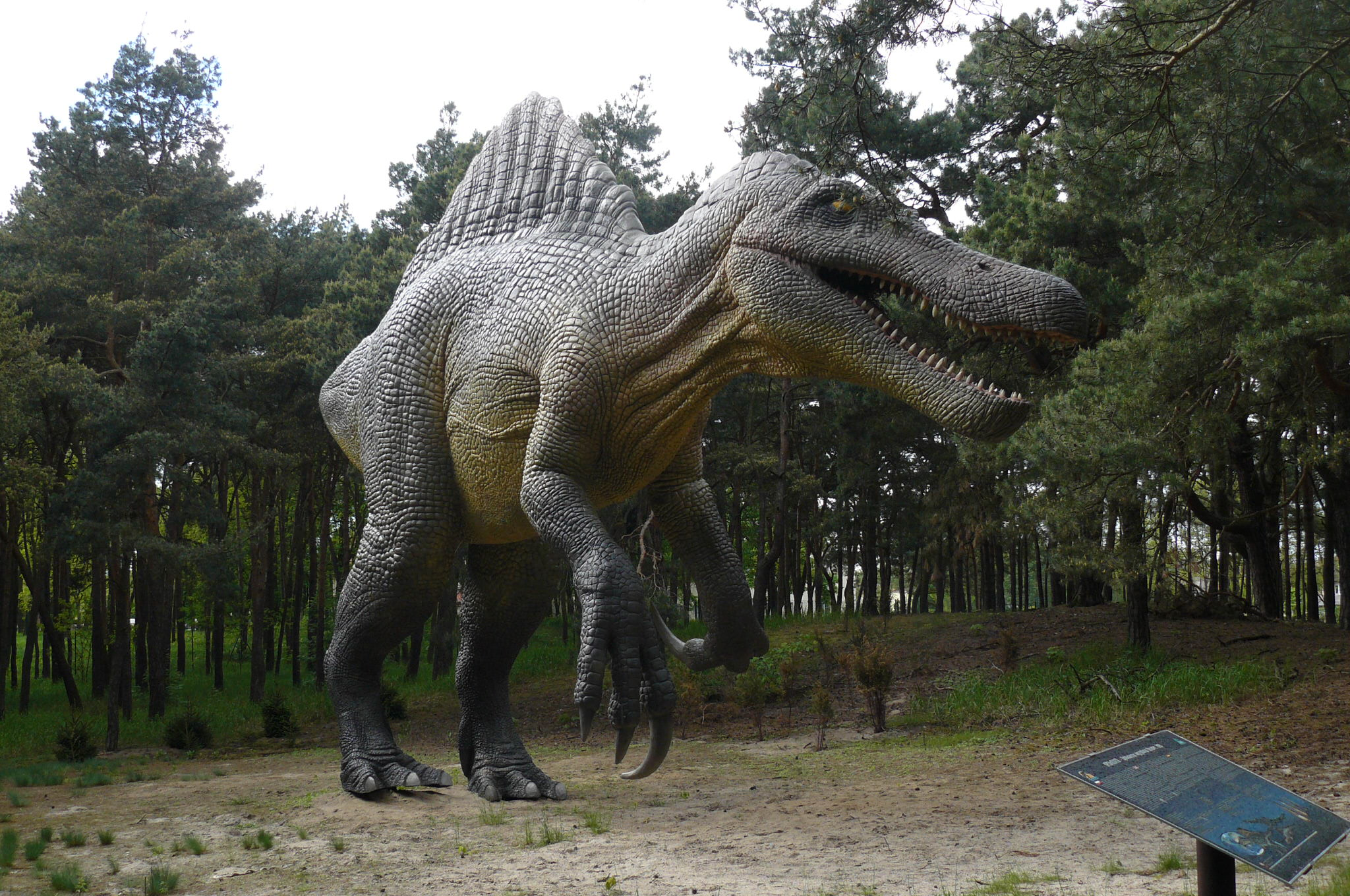
JuraPark Solec

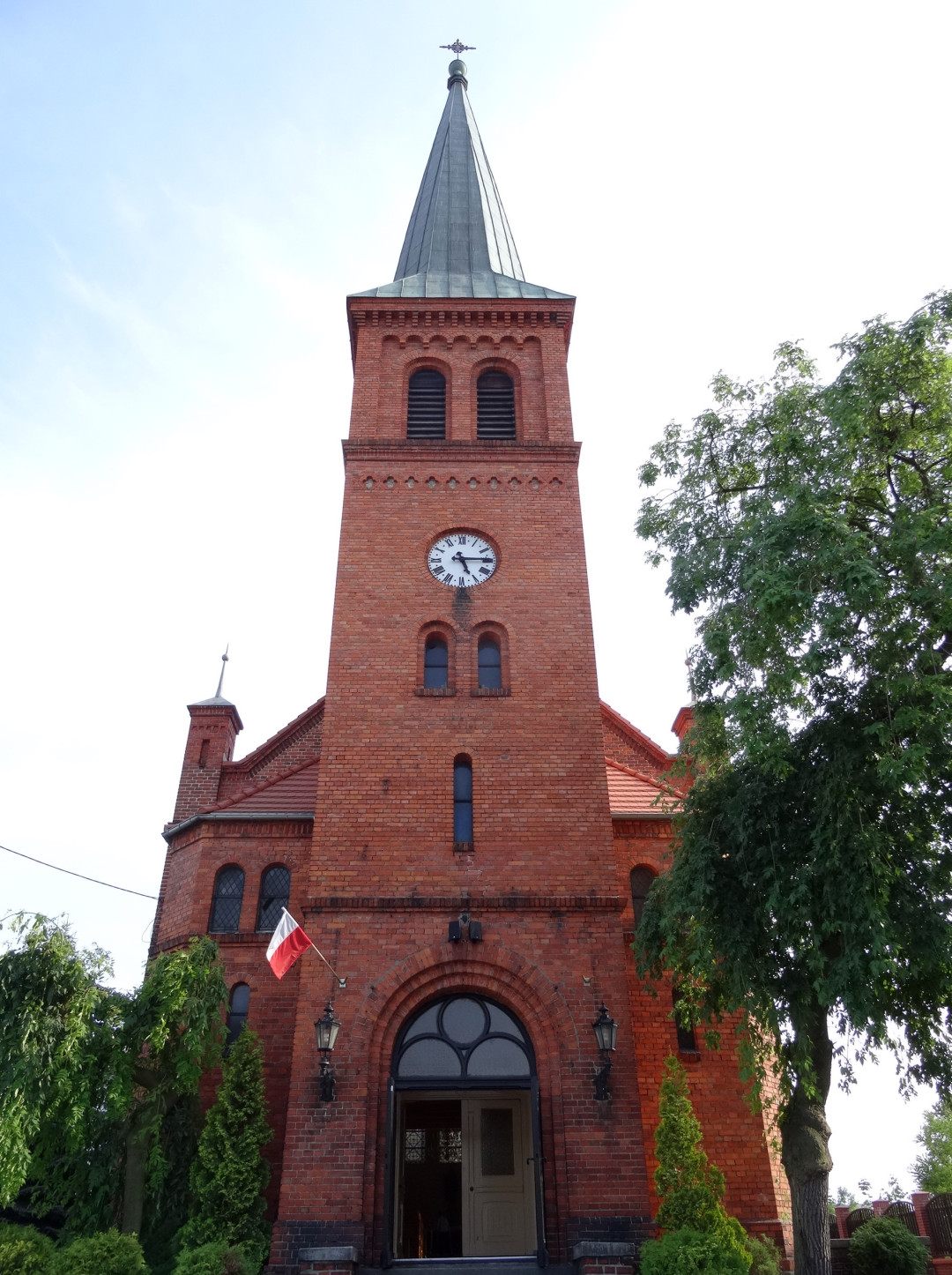
Sacred Heart church

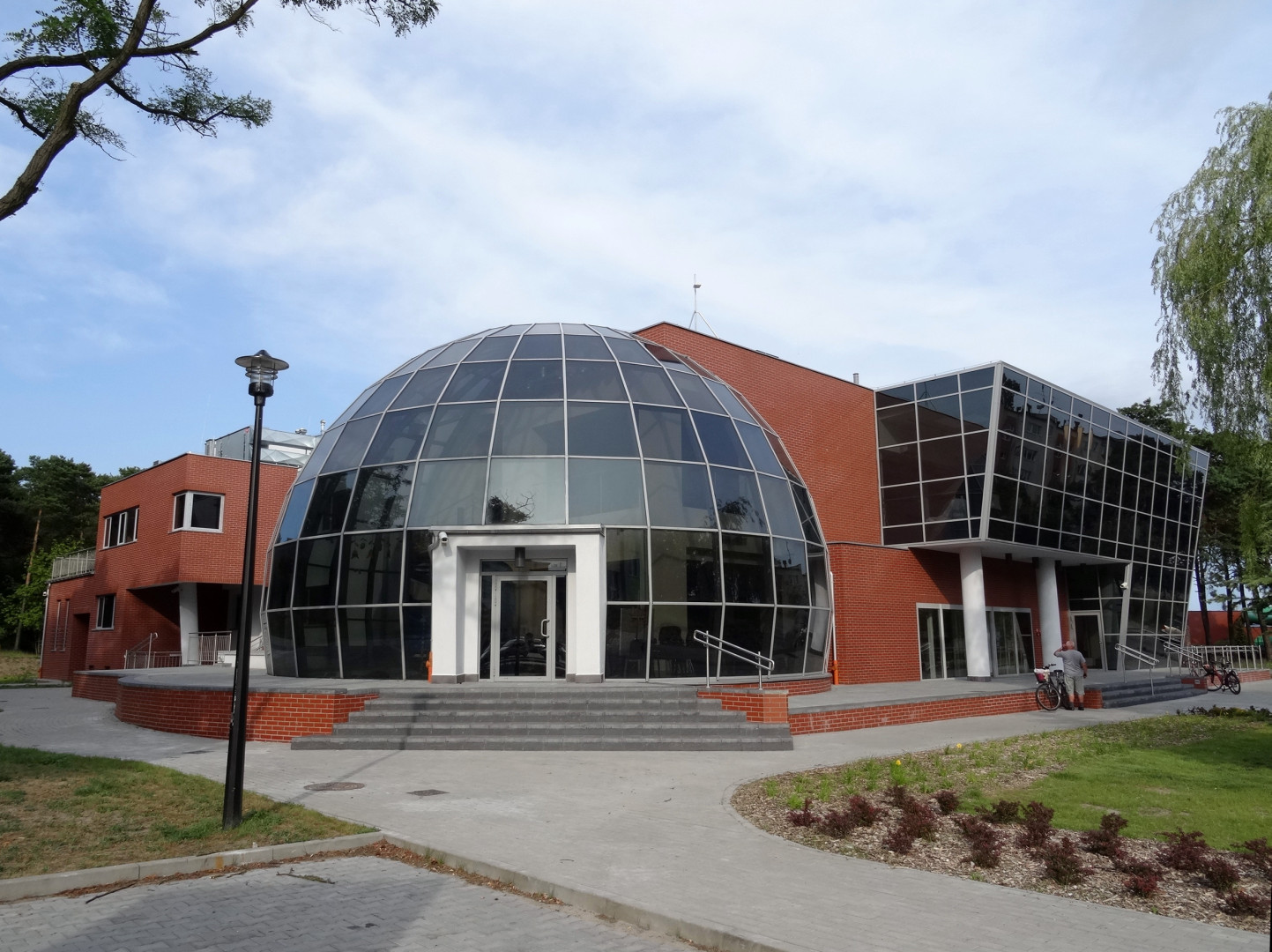
Culture Center
