= Chrośna =

- Village
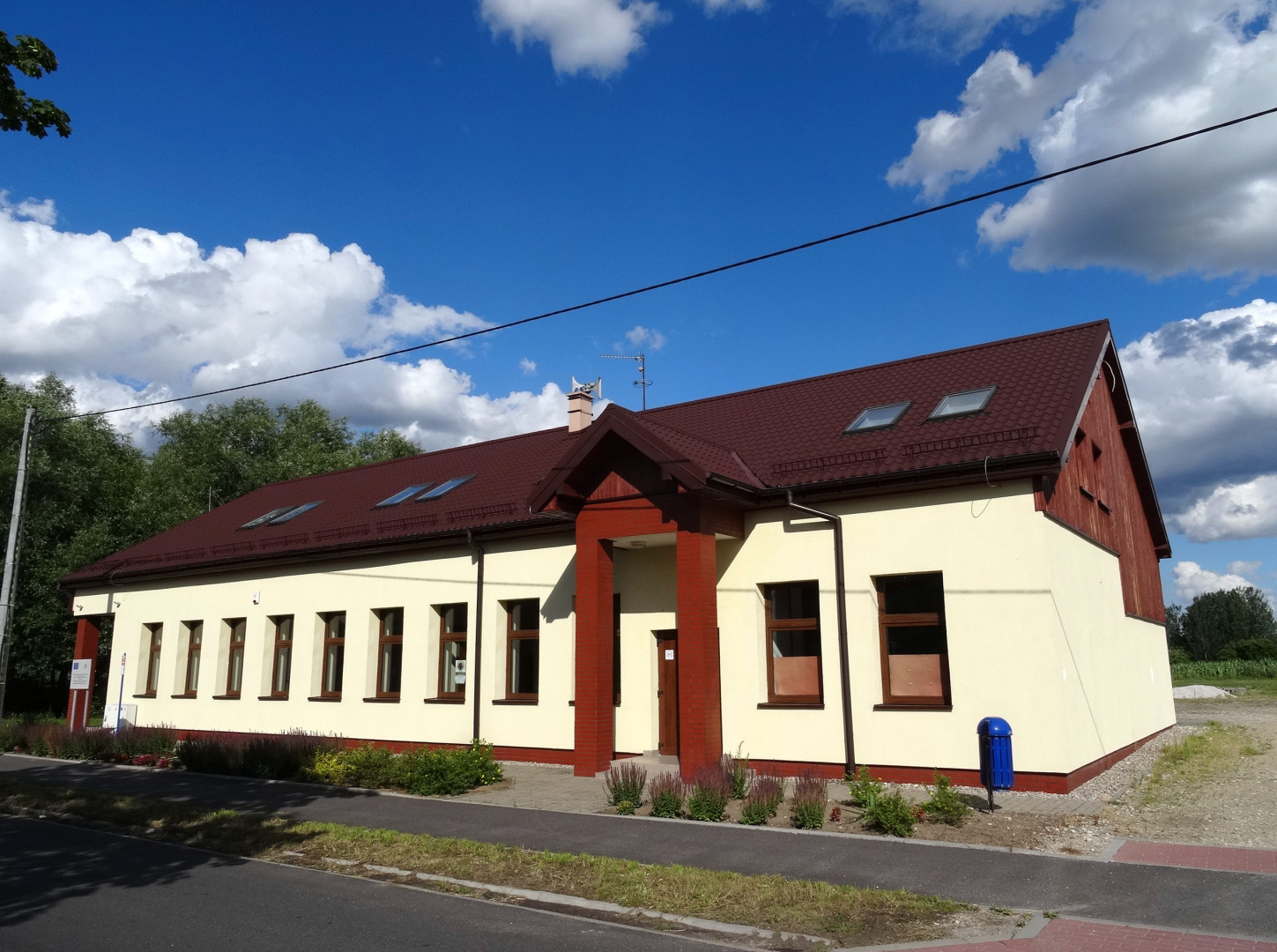

- Location within Poland
- Coordinates: 52°59′16″N 18°13′24″E
- Country: Poland
- Voivodeship: Kuyavian-Pomeranian
- County: Bydgoszcz
- Gmina: Solec Kujawski

Chrośna [ˈxrɔɕna] is a village in the administrative district of Gmina Solec Kujawski, within Bydgoszcz County, Kuyavian-Pomeranian Voivodeship, in north-central Poland.
