= Gmina Osielsko =

Gmina Osielsko Osielsko Commune
- Gmina
- Flag Coat of arms

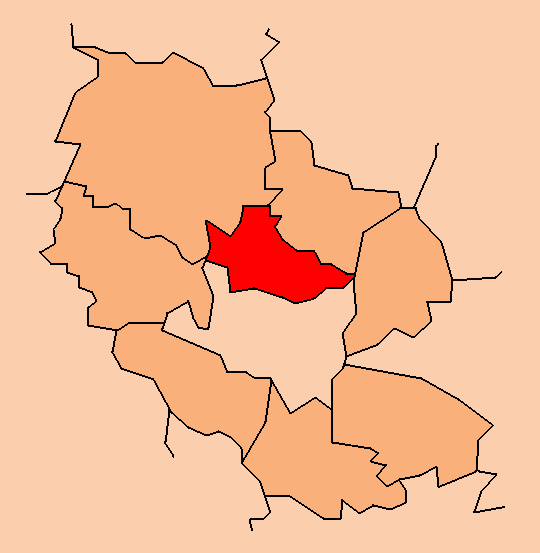
- Location within the county
- Coordinates (Osielsko): 53°11′N 18°4′E
- Country: Poland
- Voivodeship: Kuyavian-Pomeranian
- County: Bydgoszcz County
- Seat: Osielsko

Area
  - Total: 102.89 km^{2} (39.73 sq mi)

Population (2014)
  - Total: 12,239
  - Density: 118.95/km^{2} (308.08/sq mi)
- Website: http://www.osielsko.pl/

Gmina Osielsko is a rural gmina (administrative district) in Bydgoszcz County, Kuyavian-Pomeranian Voivodeship, in north-central Poland. Its seat is the village of Osielsko, which lies approximately 9 kilometres (6 mi) north-east of Bydgoszcz.

The gmina covers an area of 102.89 square kilometres (39.7 sq mi), and as of 2014 its total population is 12,239. Osielsko is the richest gmina in Kuyavian-Pomeranian Voivodeship. Osielsko's main source of wealth is personal income tax paid by inhabitants of this gmina.

== Villages ==
Gmina Osielsko contains the villages and settlements of Bożenkowo, Czarnówczyn, Jagodowo, Jarużyn, Jarużyn-Kolonia, Maksymilianowo, Myślęcinek, Niemcz, Niwy, Osielsko, Strzelce Leśne, Wilcze and Żołędowo.

== Neighbouring gminas ==
Gmina Osielsko is bordered by the city of Bydgoszcz and by the gminas of Dobrcz, Koronowo and Sicienko.

== Religion ==
There are 4 Roman Catholic parishes in Gmina Osielsko:

- parafia św. Maksymiliana Kolbego – Maksymilianowo
- parafia MB Wspomożenia Wiernych – Niemcz
- Parafia Narodzenia Najświętszej Maryi Panny w Osielsku – Osielsko
- parafia Podwyższenia Krzyża Świętego – Żołędowo

Osielsko is also a seat of dekanat Osielsko (administrative district of the Roman Catholic Church).
