= Otorowo, Kuyavian-Pomeranian Voivodeship =

Otorowo
- Village
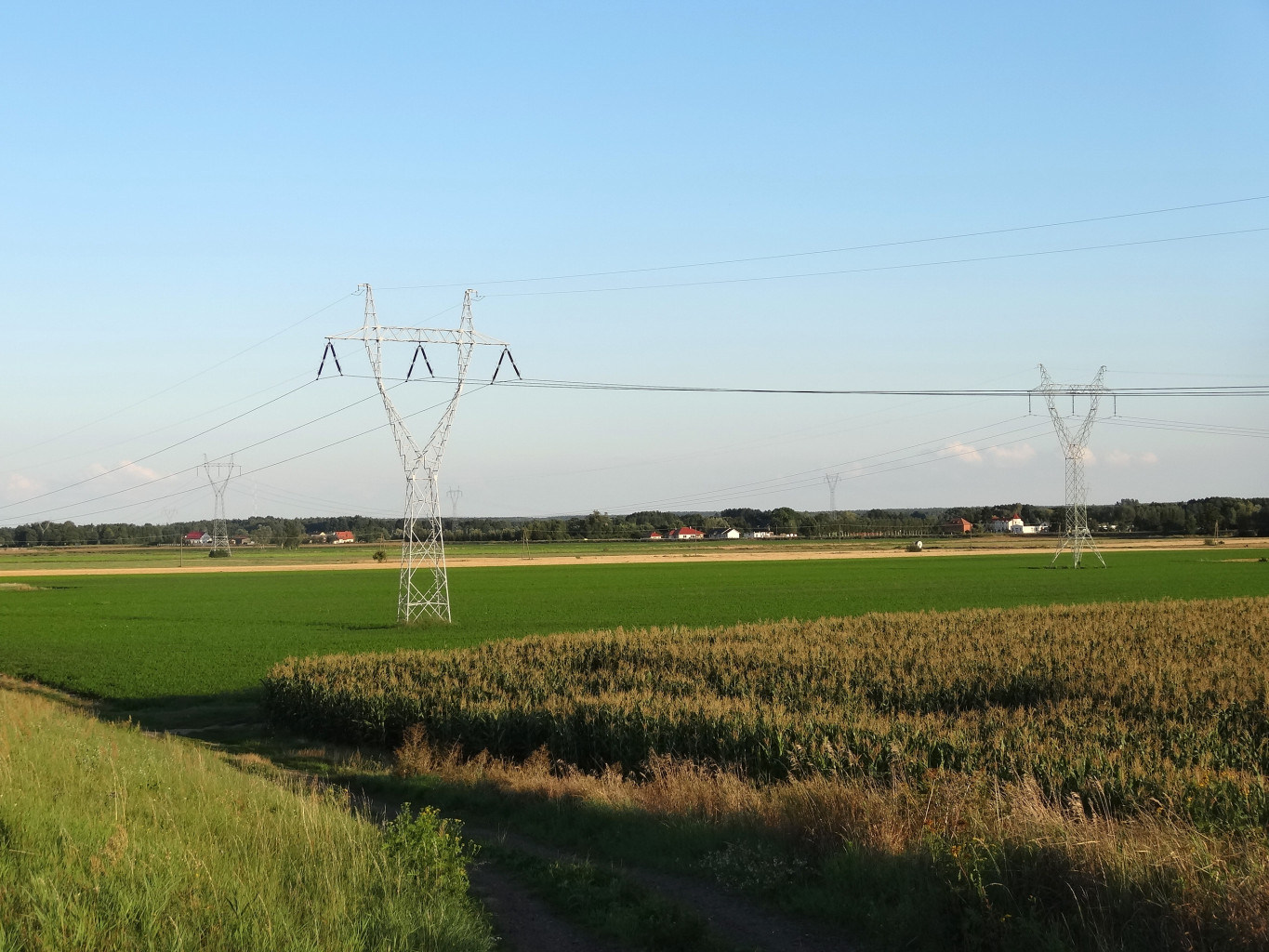

- Location within Poland
- Coordinates: 53°4′59″N 18°9′25″E
- Country: Poland
- Voivodeship: Kujawsko-Pomorskie
- County: Bydgoszcz
- Gmina: Solec Kujawski
- First mentioned: 1280

Population
  - Total: 250
- Time zone: UTC+1 (CET)
  - Summer (DST): UTC+2 (CEST)
- Vehicle registration: CBY
- Primary airport: Bydgoszcz Ignacy Jan Paderewski Airport

Otorowo [ɔtɔˈrɔvɔ] (German: Otteraue) is a village in the administrative district of Gmina Solec Kujawski, within Bydgoszcz County, Kuyavian-Pomeranian Voivodeship, in north-central Poland. It is located in the historic region of Kuyavia.

== History ==
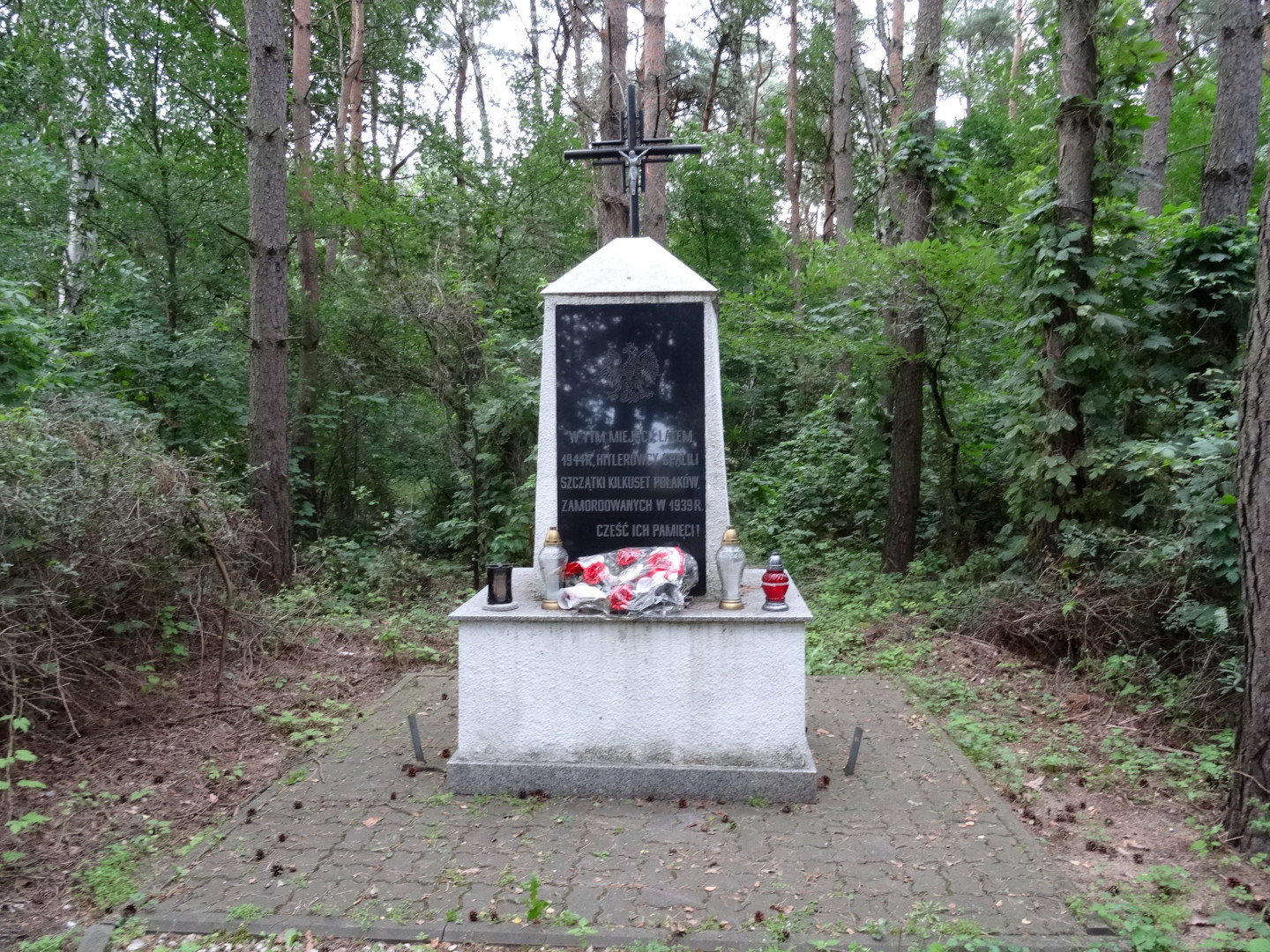
Memorial at the site of the German massacre of Poles carried out in 1939

The earliest mention of the village comes from 1280, when it was part of Piast-ruled Poland. Otorowo was a royal village of the Kingdom of Poland, administratively located in the Bydgoszcz County in the Inowrocław Voivodeship in the Greater Poland Province.

During the German occupation (World War II), in October and November 1939, Otorowo was the site of large massacres of hundreds of Poles from Otorowo and other nearby villages, carried out by the German Einsatzkommando 16 as part of the Intelligenzaktion. In 1944, the Germans burned the bodies to cover up the crime.
