= Dobrogost =

- Pronunciation: Polish: [dɔˈbrɔ.ɡɔst]
- Gender: male
- Language: Polish

Origin
- Origin: Slavic
- Meaning: dobro ("good, kind") + gost ("guest, hospitality")
- Region of origin: Poland

Other names
- Alternative spelling: Dobrohost
- Related names: Dobrosław, Dobromił, Dobromir

Dobrogost or Dobrohost is an old Polish masculine given name of Slavic origin. It is derived from the Slavic elements dobro ("kind, good") and gost ("guest, hospitality").

== Notable people with the name ==
- Dobrogost of Nowy Dwór (died 1401), Polish medieval bishop
- Jan Dobrogost Krasiński (1639–1717), Polish nobleman (szlachcic)
- Dobrogost Ostroróg (1400–1478/79), castellan of Gniezno
- Franciszek Ksawery Godebski (1801–1869), pseudonym Dobrogost, Polish writer

== See also ==
- Dobrogostów, village in Poland
- Dobrogostowo, village in Poland
- Dobrogosty (disambiguation)
- Dobrogoszcz (disambiguation)
