= Israel Yaakov Elisha Hagiz ben Avraham =

Elisha ben Avraham (Hebrew: הרב אלישא בר אברהם died 1749) was an 18th-century Polish rabbi who was the chief rabbi of Grodno and Rosh HaYeshiva (Head of the rabbinical school) of Leszyce.

Elisha was the author of the book Kav VeNaki a short commentary on the Mishnah (Amsterdam, 1697), and he annotated and published, under the title "Pi Shenayim" (Altona, 1735), Asheri's commentary on the Mishnah of Zera'im. According to Benjacob ("Oẓar ha-Sefarim", p. 382, No. 2489), the first edition of the Kav VeNaki was published in 1664; from this fact it may be concluded that Elisha lived to be more than a hundred years old.

Elisha’s parents were Rabbi Abraham ”Harif” of Leszyce and the daughter of Rabbi Moshe HaCohen Shapira who was a grandchild of Rabbi Saul Wahl Katzenellenbogen, thus being a descendant of Meir Katzenellenbogen.
