= Dobrosav =

Slavic masculine given name

- Gender: masculine

Origin
- Language: Slavic

Other names
- Related names: Dobroslav

Dobrosav (Cyrillic: Добросав) is a Serbian masculine given name. Notable people with the name include:

- Dobrosav Ćosić (1921–2014), Serbian writer, politician and political theorist
- Dobrosav Krstić (1932–2015), Serbian footballer
- Dobrosav Milojević (born 1948), Serbian painter
- Dobrosav Milovanović, Serbian lawyer and university professor
- Dobrosav Živković (born 7 May 1962), Serbian illustrator

== See also ==
- Dobroslav, given name
