= Dobromir =

Dobromir may refer to:

- Dobromir (given name)
- Dobromir, Constanța, commune in Romania
- Dobromir, Bulgaria, village in Bulgaria
- Dobromir (Kruševac), a village in Serbia
