= Dobromir (given name) =

- Gender: male

Origin
- Origin: Slavic
- Meaning: dobro ("good") + mir ("peace, world")

Other names
- Variant form: Dobromira (Добромира) (f)
- Nicknames: Dob, Dobra, Dobri, Mirko, Mirek
- Related names: Dobrosław, Dobromil, Dobrogost

Dobromir (Cyrillic: Добромир) is a Slavic masculine given name. It is derived from the Slavic elements dobro ("good, kind") and mir ("world, peace").

The feminine form of the name is Dobromira.

== Notable people with the name ==
- Dobromir Chrysos, 12th-century Vlach leader in Macedonia
- Dobromira Danailova (born 1995), Bulgarian archer
- Dobromir Dimitrov (born 1991), Bulgarian volleyball player
- Dobromir Dymecki (born 1985), Polish actor
- Dobromir Mitov (born 1972), Bulgarian footballer
- Dobromir Tashkov (1925–2017), Bulgarian footballer
- Dobromir Zhechev (1942–2025), Bulgarian football player and manager

== See also ==
- Dobromir (disambiguation)
- Dobromierz (disambiguation)
