= Dobroslav =

Dobroslav / Dobrosław
- Pronunciation: Czech: [ˈdobroslaf] Slovak: [ˈdɔbrɔslaʋ] Serbo-Croatian: [dǒbroslâʋ]
- Gender: male

Origin
- Origin: Slavic
- Meaning: dobro ("good") + slava/sława ("glory, fame")

Other names
- Variant forms: Dobroslava (f), Dobrosława (f)
- Related names: Dobrosav, Dobromir, Dobromil

Dobroslav (Cyrillic: Доброслав) is a Slavic masculine given name, derived from the Slavic elements dobro (good) and slava (glory, fame).

The Polish spelling is Dobrosław. The respective feminine forms are Dobroslava and Dobrosława.

A Serbian variant form of the name is Dobrosav.

== Notable people with the name ==
=== Dobroslav / Dobroslava ===
- Stefan Vojislav (fl. 1018–1043), anachronistically called Dobroslav, Prince of the Serbs
- Dobroslav II (fl. 1081–1103), Serbian medieval ruler
- Dobroslav Chrobák (1907–1951), Slovak writer
- Jonatán Dobroslav Čipka (1819-1861), Slovak priest, poet and author
- Dobroslav Jevđević (1895–1962), Bosnian Serb politician and Chetnik commander
- Dobroslava Menclová (1904–1978), Czech art historian and architect
- Dobroslav Paraga (born 1960), Croatian politician
- Dobroslav Trnka (1963-2023), Slovak lawyer
- Alexey Dobrovolsky, (also known as Dobroslav; 1938-2013), Russian anarchist and neo-paganist

=== Dobrosław / Dobrosława ===
- Dobrosława of Pomerania, Pomeranian medieval countess and princess
- Dobrosław Kot (born 1976), Polish writer and philosopher
- Dobrosława Miodowicz-Wolf (1953–1986), Polish alpinist

== See also ==
- Dobrosław (disambiguation)
- Dobroslav, Ukraine, an urban locality in Odesa Oblast, Ukraine
- Dobroslava, a village and municipality in Svidník District, Slovakia
- Dobrosloveni, a commune in Olt County, Romania
- Dobroslavtsi, a village in Sofia in western Bulgaria
