= Piecki, Bydgoszcz County =

Piecki
- Village
- Location within Poland
- Coordinates: 53°1′46″N 18°3′44″E
- Country: Poland
- Voivodeship: Kuyavian-Pomeranian
- County: Bydgoszcz
- Gmina: Nowa Wieś Wielka
- Population: 40

Piecki [ˈpjɛt͡ski] is a village in the administrative district of Gmina Nowa Wieś Wielka, within Bydgoszcz County, Kuyavian-Pomeranian Voivodeship, in north-central Poland.
