= Kolankowo, Bydgoszcz County =

Kolankowo
- Village
- Location within Poland
- Coordinates: 52°59′N 18°2′E
- Country: Poland
- Voivodeship: Kuyavian-Pomeranian
- County: Bydgoszcz
- Gmina: Nowa Wieś Wielka

Kolankowo [kɔlanˈkɔvɔ] is a village in the administrative district of Gmina Nowa Wieś Wielka, within Bydgoszcz County, Kuyavian-Pomeranian Voivodeship, in north-central Poland.
