= Gmina Nowa Wieś Wielka =

Gmina Nowa Wieś Wielka Nowa Wieś Wielka Commune
- Gmina
- Flag Coat of arms

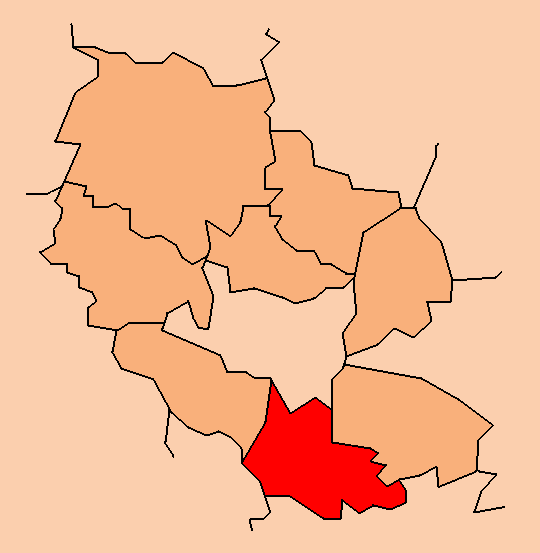
- Location within the county
- Coordinates (Nowa Wieś Wielka): 52°58′13″N 18°5′29″E
- Country: Poland
- Voivodeship: Kuyavian-Pomeranian
- County: Bydgoszcz County
- Seat: Nowa Wieś Wielka

Area
  - Total: 148.47 km^{2} (57.32 sq mi)

Population (2006)
  - Total: 8,176
  - Density: 55.07/km^{2} (142.6/sq mi)
- Website: http://www.nowawieswielka.pl

Gmina Nowa Wieś Wielka is a rural gmina (administrative district) in Bydgoszcz County, Kuyavian-Pomeranian Voivodeship, in north-central Poland. Its seat is the village of Nowa Wieś Wielka, which lies approximately 18 kilometres (11 mi) south of Bydgoszcz.

The gmina covers an area of 148.47 square kilometres (57.32 sq mi), and as of 2006 its total population is 8,176.

== Villages ==
Gmina Nowa Wieś Wielka contains the villages and settlements of Brzoza, Chmielniki, Dąbrowa Wielka, Dobromierz, Dziemionna, Emilianowo, Jakubowo, Januszkowo, Kobylarnia, Kolankowo, Leszyce, Nowa Wieś Wielka, Nowa Wioska, Nowe Smolno, Olimpin, Piecki, Prądocin and Tarkowo Dolne.

== Neighbouring gminas ==
Gmina Nowa Wieś Wielka is bordered by the city of Bydgoszcz and by the gminas of Białe Błota, Łabiszyn, Rojewo, Solec Kujawski and Złotniki Kujawskie.
