= Dobromil (given name) =

- Gender: male

Origin
- Origin: Slavic

Other names
- Alternative spelling: Dobromił
- Variant forms: Dobromila (f), Dobromiła (f)
- Related names: Dobrosław, Dobromir, Dobrogost

Dobromil is a Slavic masculine given name. It is derived from the Slavic elements dobro ("kind, good") and mil ("dear, gracious").

The Polish form of the name is Dobromił. The respective feminine forms are Dobromila and Dobromiła.

== Notable people with the name ==
- Magdalena Dobromila Rettigová (1785–1845), Czech cookbook author

== See also ==
- Dobromil (disambiguation)
- Dobrosław
