= Tarkowo Dolne =

- Village
- Location within Poland
- Coordinates: 52°57′N 18°7′E
- Country: Poland
- Voivodeship: Kuyavian-Pomeranian
- County: Bydgoszcz
- Gmina: Nowa Wieś Wielka

Tarkowo Dolne [tarˈkɔvɔ ˈdɔlnɛ] is a village in the administrative district of Gmina Nowa Wieś Wielka, within Bydgoszcz County, Kuyavian-Pomeranian Voivodeship, in north-central Poland.

In the pre-partition period, Tarkowo was a noble village. It was mentioned in a register from the Kujawy area from 1489. In the 16th century Tarkowo belonged to the Roman Catholic parish in Pęchów. The village was owned by the Sośnicki noble family, and from 1764 by the Kraszewski family. In 1583, the village had six fields of arable land. In the 18th century, as part of the Olęder colonization on the outskirts of the Bydgoszcz Forest, supported by, among others, the starosts and mayors of Bydgoszcz, the village of Tarkowskie Olędry was established. This initiated the division of the village into an upper, noble part located on the moraine plateau, and a lower, Olęder part located in the valley, with peat soil and extensive meadows. Catholics predominated in the upper part, and Evangelicals in the lower part. The 1833 census of the Bydgoszcz region states that 115 people (all Evangelicals) lived in 18 houses in the village of Tarkowskie Holendry (German: Tarkower Haulander). The village belonged to the Evangelical parish in Łabiszyn. The 1860 census states that 152 people (129 Evangelicals, 23 Catholics) lived in 17 houses in Tarkowskie Olędry. The nearest elementary schools were in Nowa Wioska (Evangelical) and Lisewo (Catholic). The 1884 geographical dictionary of the Kingdom of Poland states that Tarkowskie Olędry (German: Tarkowo Hauland, later Kol. Tannhofen) was a village in the district of Inowrocław, with 206 inhabitants (190 Protestants, 16 Catholics) living in 23 houses. The village had an area of 224 ha, of which 112 ha was cultivated land and 99 ha meadows. The nearest post office and railway station were in Nowa Wieś Wielka. The village belonged to the Catholic parish in Pęchów and the Evangelical parish in Nowa Wieś Wielka. During the Great Poland Uprising (1919), Polish insurgent troops were stationed in Tarkowo Dolne, Krążkowo, Pałczyna and Dąbrówka Kujawska. Attempts to advance on Bydgoszcz were unsuccessful, despite temporary successes, including the capture of Nowa Wieś Wielka and Brzoza. In January 1920, under the Treaty of Versailles, the village became part of the reborn Poland. It remained in the district of Inowrocław. In 1934, as a result of administrative reform, it was included in the Złotniki Kujawskie rural commune. The village had a four-grade elementary school with German as the language of instruction. In 1937, the school in Złotniki Kujawskie became a collective school, and about a dozen students from Tarkowo began attending it from the fourth grade. After the war, the bodies of Poles murdered from the villages of Dziemionna, Jakubowo, Januszkowo, Krążkowo, Prądocin and Tarkowo were exhumed and buried at the cemetery in Lisewo Kościelny, where a monument to them was erected in 1965. From 1945 to 1954, Tarkowo (including Górne and Dolne) was a rural cluster within the Złotniki Kujawskie commune. In 1947, during discussions about the new administrative division, the village's representatives were in favor of remaining within the territorial boundaries of the Złotniki Kujawskie commune, citing economic and transport connections. After the administrative reform of September 25, 1954, the village was divided between the districts of Bydgoszcz and Inowrocław. The part attached to the Nowa Wieś Wielka cluster has been known as Tarkowo Dolne since 1954. On May 13, 1955, the Presidium of the District National Council in Nowa Wieś Wielka asked the Presidium of the Poviat National Council in Bydgoszcz for the final delimitation of the boundary between the villages of Tarkowo Dolne and Tarkowo Górne. In 1946, there was a one-grade public school in the village. Until 1961 it operated as a full school with a seven-class program; it was then closed, and children from the village were sent to the school district in Nowa Wieś Wielka. In 1955, a common room was opened in Tarkowo Dolne, and from 1964 members of the Union of Rural Youth ran a library point in the village. The village was electrified between 1958 and 1961. In 1964, a bus line between Tarkowo Dolne and Brzoza (24 km) was opened. A year later, a club café opened in the village. In 2001-2002, the village was connected to the water supply system.
