= Dobromierz =

Dobromierz may refer to the following places:

- Dobromierz, Kuyavian-Pomeranian Voivodeship, (north-central Poland)
- Dobromierz, Lower Silesian Voivodeship, (south-west Poland)
- Dobromierz, Świętokrzyskie Voivodeship, (south-central Poland)
