= Jakubowo, Kuyavian-Pomeranian Voivodeship =

Jakubowo
- Village
- Location within Poland
- Coordinates: 52°58′N 18°1′E
- Country: Poland
- Voivodeship: (Kuyavian–Pomeranian Voivodeship) Kuyavian-Pomeranian
- County: Bydgoszcz
- Gmina: Nowa Wieś Wielka

Jakubowo [jakuˈbɔvɔ] is a village in the administrative district of Gmina Nowa Wieś Wielka, within Bydgoszcz County, Kuyavian-Pomeranian Voivodeship, in north-central Poland.
