= Dobromil =

Dobromil may refer to:

- Dobromil (given name), a given name of Slavic origin
- Dobromil, Lower Silesian Voivodeship (south-west Poland)
- Dobromil, Podlaskie Voivodeship (north-east Poland)
- Dobromilice, a village and municipality (obec) in Prostějov District in the Olomouc Region of the Czech Republic.
- Dobromil, the Polish name for the town of Dobromyl, Ukraine

== See also ==
- Dobrosław
