= Nowa Wioska, Kuyavian-Pomeranian Voivodeship =

Nowa Wioska
- Village
- Location within Poland
- Coordinates: 52°58′N 18°7′E
- Country: Poland
- Voivodeship: Kuyavian-Pomeranian
- County: Bydgoszcz
- Gmina: Nowa Wieś Wielka

Nowa Wioska [ˈnɔva ˈvjɔska] is a village in the administrative district of Gmina Nowa Wieś Wielka, within Bydgoszcz County, Kuyavian-Pomeranian Voivodeship, in north-central Poland.
