= Nowe Smolno =

- Village
- Location within Poland
- Coordinates: 52°59′00″N 17°58′00″E
- Country: Poland
- Voivodeship: Kuyavian-Pomeranian
- County: Bydgoszcz
- Gmina: Nowa Wieś Wielka

Nowe Smolno [ˈnɔvɛ ˈsmɔlnɔ] is a village in the administrative district of Gmina Nowa Wieś Wielka, within Bydgoszcz County, Kuyavian-Pomeranian Voivodeship, in north-central Poland.
