= Dobroslava =

- Municipality
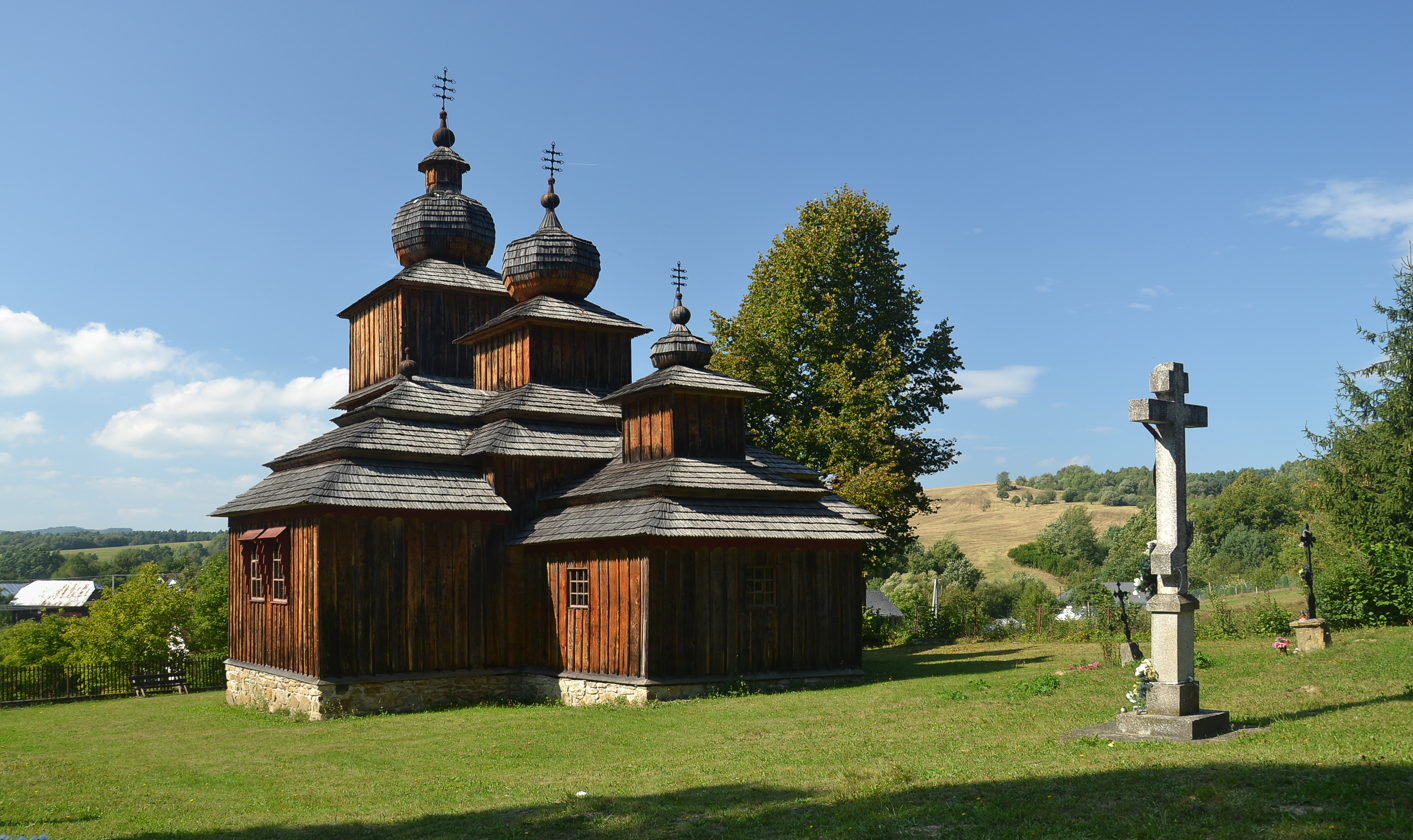

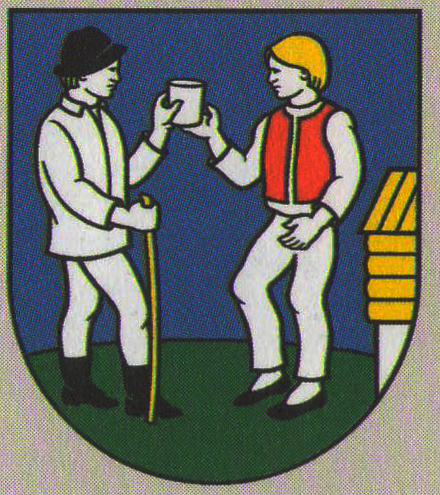
- Flag Coat of arms

- Location of Dobroslava in the Prešov Region Location of Dobroslava in Slovakia
- Coordinates: 49.37°N 21.62°E
- Country: Slovakia
- Region: Prešov Region
- District: Svidník District
- First mentioned: 1600

Government
  - Mayor: Vladimír Vančišin (Independent)

Area
  - Total: 5.57 km^{2} (2.15 sq mi)
- Elevation: 319 m (1,047 ft)

Population (2025)
  - Total: 49
- Time zone: UTC+1 (CET)
  - Summer (DST): UTC+2 (CEST)
- Postal code: 900 1
- Area code: +421 54
- Vehicle registration plate (until 2022): SK

Dobroslava (Rusyn: Доброслава; Hungarian: Dobroszló, until 1899: Dobroszlava) is a village and municipality in Svidník District in the Prešov Region of north-eastern Slovakia.

== History ==
In historical records the village was first mentioned in 1600. The village is primarily inhabited by Rusyns. There was heavy fighting in and around the village as part of the Battle of the Dukla Pass in October 1944.

== Geography ==
The municipality lies at an altitude of 319 metres (1,047 ft) and covers an area of 5.57 km^{2} (2.15 sq mi) (2025).

== Population ==
Population statistic (10 years)
Year	1995	2005	2015	2025
Count	56	36	28	49
Difference		−35.71%	−22.22%	+75%

Population statistic
Year	2024	2025
Count	49	49
Difference		+0%

It has a population of 49 people (31 December 2025).

=== Ethnicity ===
Census 2021 (1+ %)
Ethnicity	Number	Fraction
Slovak	38	82.6%
Rusyn	21	45.65%
Ukrainian	3	6.52%
Not found out	1	2.17%
Total	46	

In year 2021 was 46 people by ethnicity 38 as Slovak, 21 as Rusyn, 3 as Ukrainian and 1 as Not found out.

Note on population: The difference values of population numbers in the table "Population statistic" and in the sections "Ethnicity" & "Religion" is caused by the use of various statistical methods.

=== Religion ===
Census 2021 (1+ %)
Religion	Number	Fraction
Greek Catholic Church	22	47.83%
Eastern Orthodox Church	15	32.61%
Roman Catholic Church	5	10.87%
None	4	8.7%
Total	46	

In year 2021 was 46 people by religion 22 from Greek Catholic Church, 15 from Eastern Orthodox Church, 5 from Roman Catholic Church and 4 from None.

== Genealogical resources ==
The records for genealogical research are available at the state archive "Statny Archiv in Presov, Slovakia".

- Greek Catholic church records (births/marriages/deaths): 1860-1895 (parish B)

== See also ==
- Dobrosława, a Slavic name
- List of municipalities and towns in Slovakia
