= Exploseum =

Coordinates: 53.071°N 18.074°E

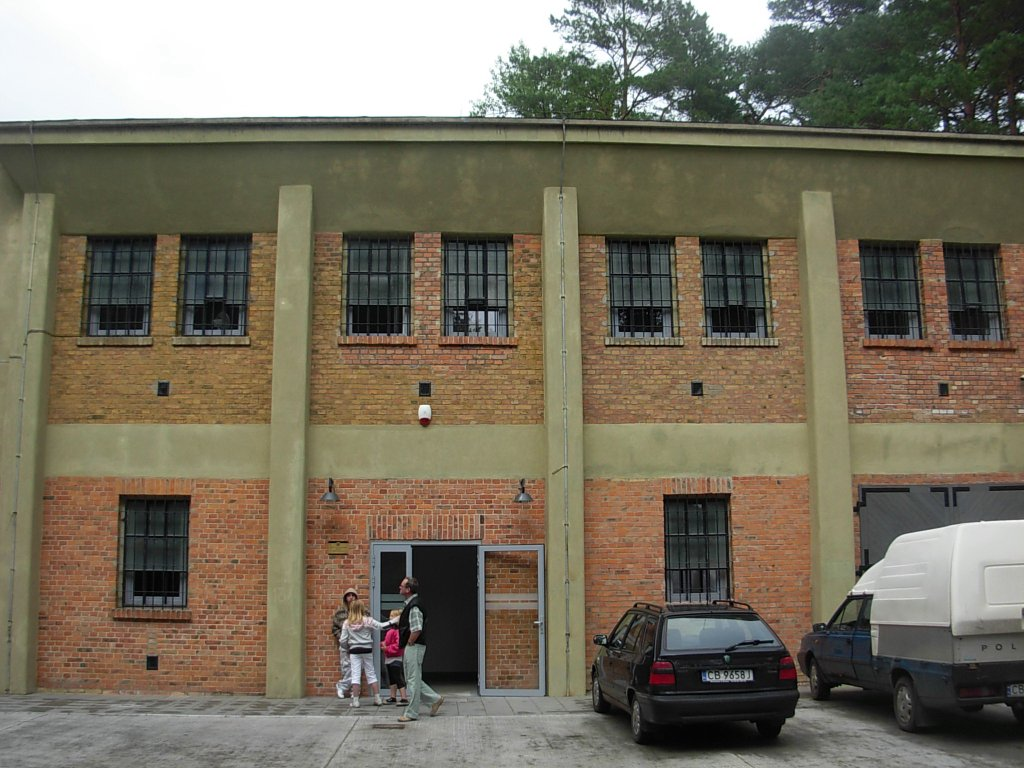
Exploseum entrance

The Exploseum ("explosines + museum"; Polish: Exploseum – Centrum techniki wojennej DAG Fabrik Bromberg) is an open-air museum of industrial architecture combined with a museum of 20th century technology in Bydgoszcz, Poland. It is built around the World War II Nazi Germany munitions factory DAG Fabrik Bromberg. It is an anchor point on the European Route of Industrial Heritage. A significant part of the 2 kilometre-long museum route are underground passages connecting the factory buildings. The exposition covers the life of the forced laborers (prisoners of war and concentration camp inmates of various nations, with the majority being Poles), including their acts of sabotage, as well as the history of the DAG and of Alfred Nobel, the inventor of dynamite. The largest building contains the presentation of the history of arms and explosive materials since 15th century.

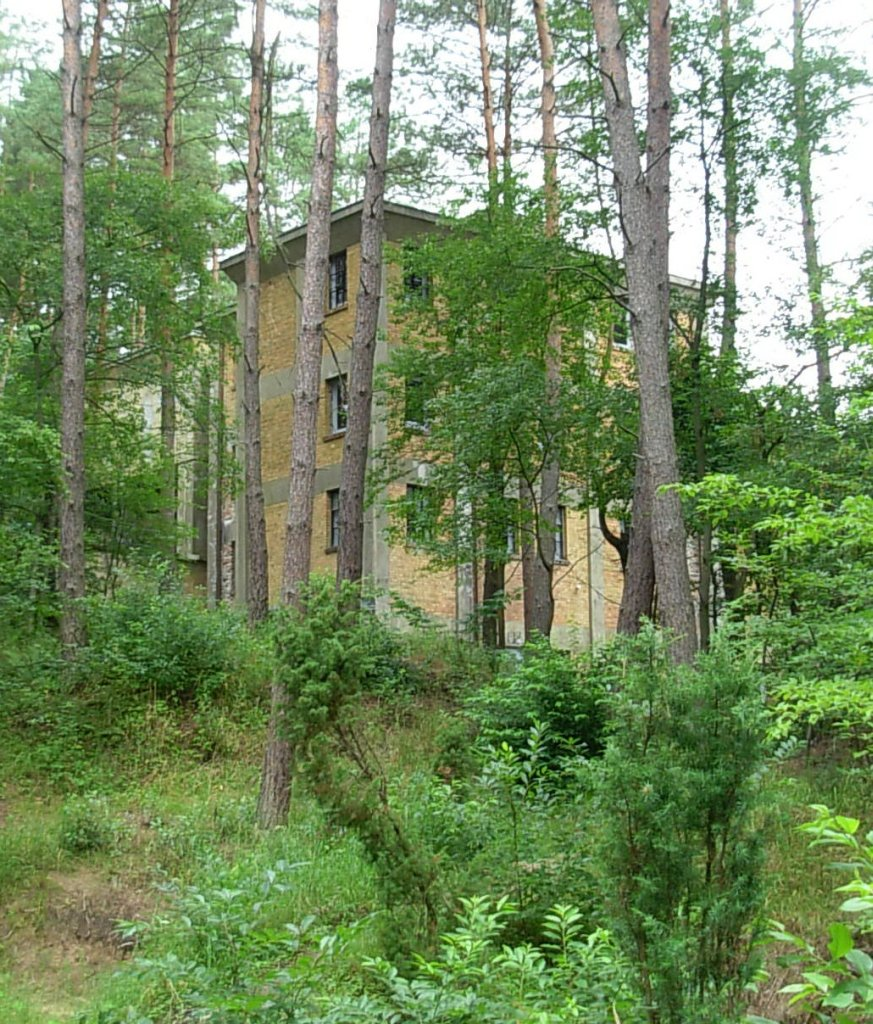
An Exploseum building in the woods

== History ==
In autumn 2007, the Regional Museum "Leon Wyczółkowski" took over under its supervision a complex of Nazi-factory buildings of DAG Fabrik Bromberg, located in the forest, in the south-east of the city. The ensemble was built during World War II in order to produce explosives and ammunition for the German war effort. It was manned by thousands of prisoners of war and forced laborers from all over Europe, under the supervision of German specialists.

The most valuable part of the complex is NGL-Betrieb, where the nitroglycerin plant stands. The individual buildings are still preserved and connected by a near-2 kilometres (1.2 miles) long network of overground and underground tunnels. In 2009–2011, a project was launched to revive the area, called Open-air museum of industrial architecture with an underground tourist route and the Museum of Armaments Works DAG Fabrik Bromberg. The outcome of the programme was the creation of the Exploseum.
