= Nowa Wieś Wielka, Kuyavian-Pomeranian Voivodeship =

Nowa Wieś Wielka
- Village
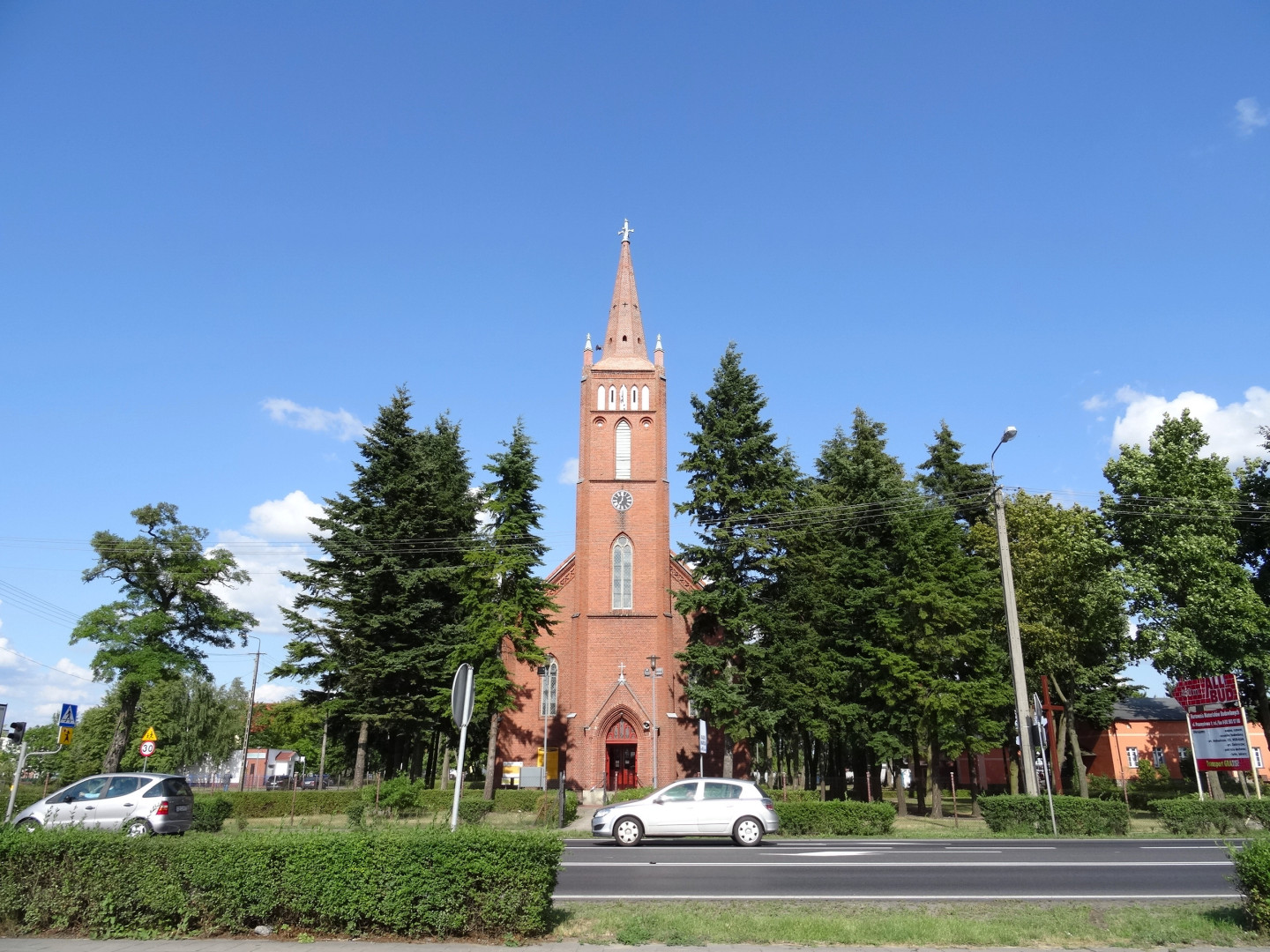
- Church of the Immaculate Conception of the Virgin Mary

- Location within Poland
- Coordinates: 52°58′13″N 18°5′29″E
- Country: Poland
- Voivodeship: Kuyavian-Pomeranian
- County: Bydgoszcz
- Gmina: Nowa Wieś Wielka

Population
  - Total: 2,207

Nowa Wieś Wielka ([ˈnɔva ˈvjɛɕ ˈvjɛlka]; "Great New Village") is a village in Bydgoszcz County, Kuyavian-Pomeranian Voivodeship, in north-central Poland. It is the seat of the gmina (administrative district) called Gmina Nowa Wieś Wielka.
