= Olimpin =

- Village
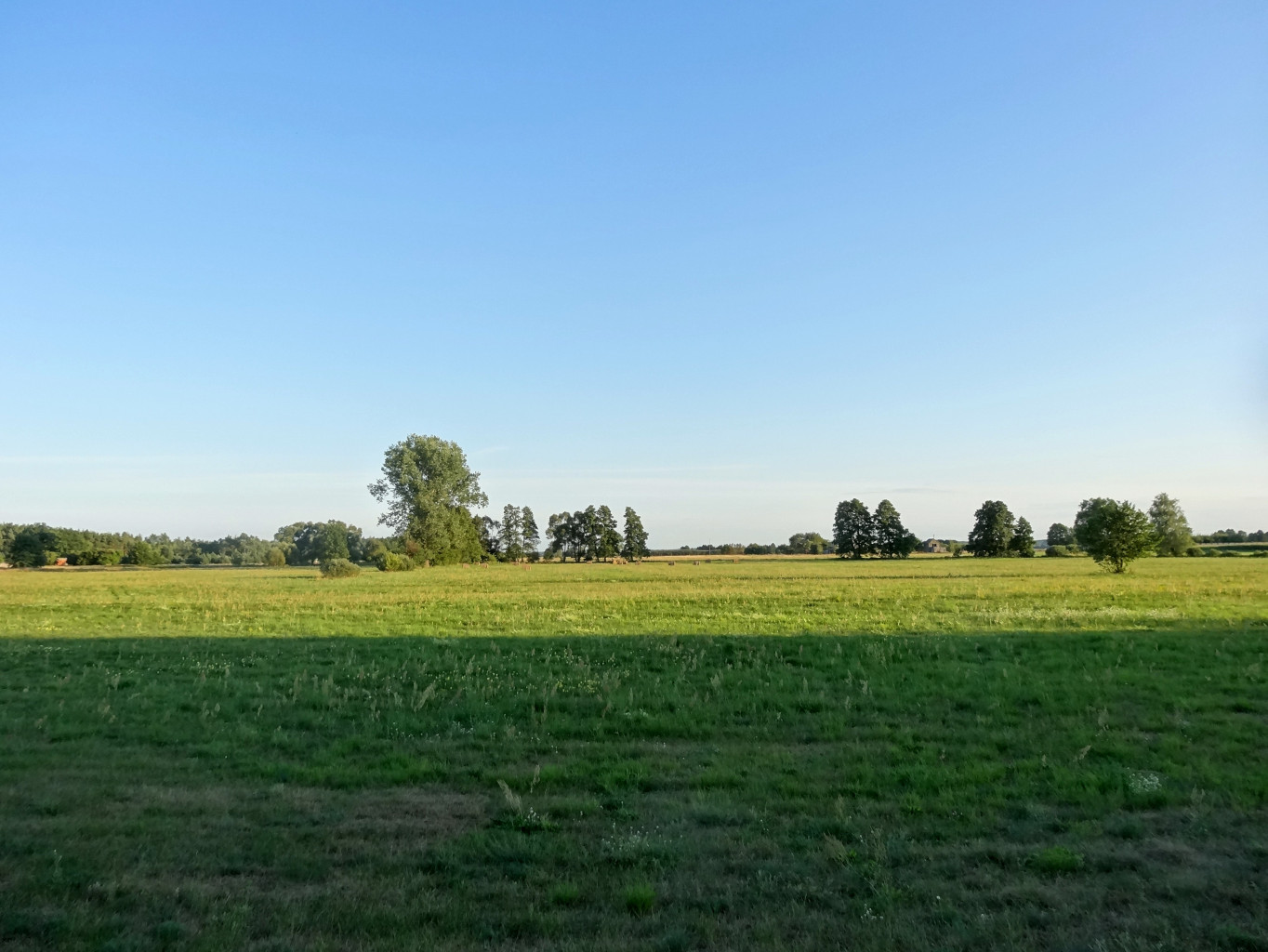
- Fields in Olimpin

- Location within Poland
- Coordinates: 53°01′45″N 17°57′56″E
- Country: Poland
- Voivodeship: Kuyavian-Pomeranian
- County: Bydgoszcz
- Gmina: Nowa Wieś Wielka

Olimpin [ɔˈlimpin] is a village in the administrative district of Gmina Nowa Wieś Wielka, within Bydgoszcz County, Kuyavian-Pomeranian Voivodeship, in north-central Poland.
