= Miasto grobów. Uwertura =

Science fiction short story by Wit Szostak

- Author: Wit Szostak
- Language: Polish
- Genre: science fiction short story
- Publisher: Runa Publishing House
- Publication date: 2007
- Publication place: Poland

Miasto grobów. Uwertura (City of Graves. Overture) is a science fiction short story by Wit Szostak published in 2007 in the second volume of the anthology Księga strachu (The Book of Fear) by the Runa Publishing House. The story is classified under the genres of alternate history, urban fantasy, and horror.

== Plot ==
The story depicts events in an alternate history where, following the fall of communism in Poland, the country becomes a monarchy. The narrator is the secretary to the Polish king.

== Reception ==
In 2008, the story was awarded the Janusz A. Zajdel Award for the previous year. Szostak put the statuette he won for the story up for auction in 2013.

In a review of the anthology on the Katedra portal, Tymoteusz Wronka considered this story to be the best in the collection (the anthology Księga strachu). On the same portal, Adam Ł. Rotter praised the story for its intriguing ideas, especially the "universal ... theme of the national funeral", but criticized it for excessive use of special effects and a "trite, mediocre ending". Conversely, in a review of the anthology on the Paradoks portal, Agnieszka Krzyżewska rated the story as one of the best in the collection, calling it "another excellent story with an interesting idea".

In 2009, the story was ranked 18th on the list of 100 Best Polish Fantastic Short Stories in the zine Esensja. The reviewer praised the story for its original format (a recording of fictional, unedited mp3 files), its avoidance of ideological disputes, and described it as "wise, beautiful, and moving". The previous year, in the same zine, Konrad Wągrowski wrote in his review of the anthology that the story was "charming", seemed like a prelude to something greater, and was "one of the most evocative texts in the entire collection, original and memorable".

== Analysis ==
In the zine Esensja, the story is described as "a personal tale of an exceptional and isolated individual due to their uniqueness, avoiding clichés about alienation, combined with imaginative, urban fantasy tinged with horror. It also delves into reflections on Polishness and Polish (and human) mentality, as well as the author's fascination with music and architecture".

Some reviewers suggest that the theme of the national funeral in the story was inspired by the funeral of John Paul II in 2005.
