= Januszkowo, Bydgoszcz County =

Januszkowo
- Village
- Location within Poland
- Coordinates: 52°59′N 18°4′E
- Country: Poland
- Voivodeship: Kuyavian-Pomeranian
- County: Bydgoszcz
- Gmina: Nowa Wieś Wielka

Januszkowo [januʂˈkɔvɔ] is a small village in the administrative district of Gmina Nowa Wieś Wielka, within Bydgoszcz County, Kuyavian-Pomeranian Voivodeship, in north-central Poland.
