= Dąbrowa Wielka, Kuyavian-Pomeranian Voivodeship =

Dąbrowa Wielka
- Village
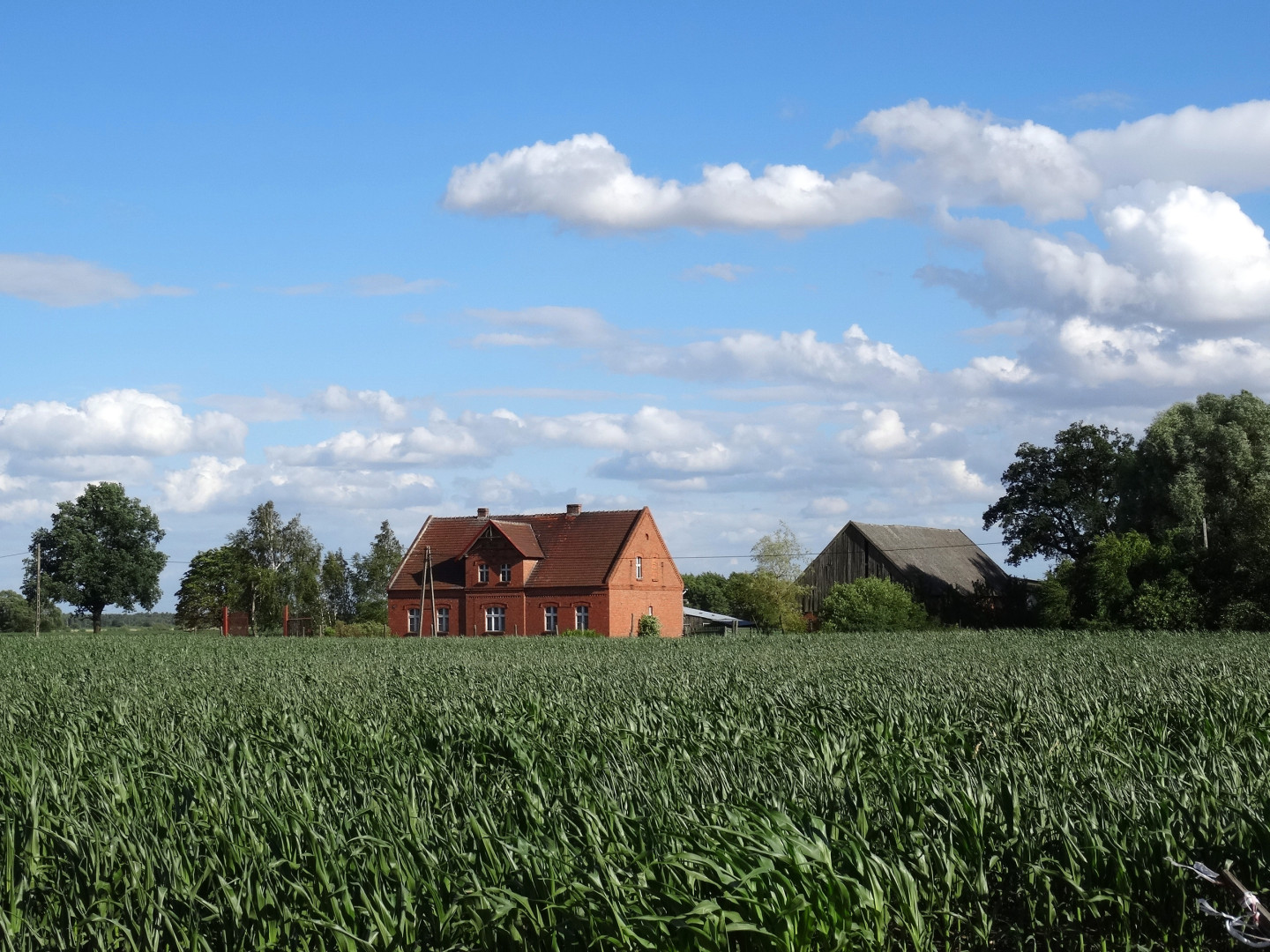
- View of village of Dąbrowa Wielka, Nowa Wieś Wielka commune

- Location within Poland
- Coordinates: 52°57′9″N 18°10′40″E
- Country: Poland
- Voivodeship: Kuyavian-Pomeranian
- County: Bydgoszcz
- Gmina: Nowa Wieś Wielka

Dąbrowa Wielka [dɔmˈbrɔva ˈvjɛlka] is a village in the administrative district of Gmina Nowa Wieś Wielka, within Bydgoszcz County, Kuyavian-Pomeranian Voivodeship, in north-central Poland.
