= Wit Szostak =

Polish fantasy writer, philosopher and historian

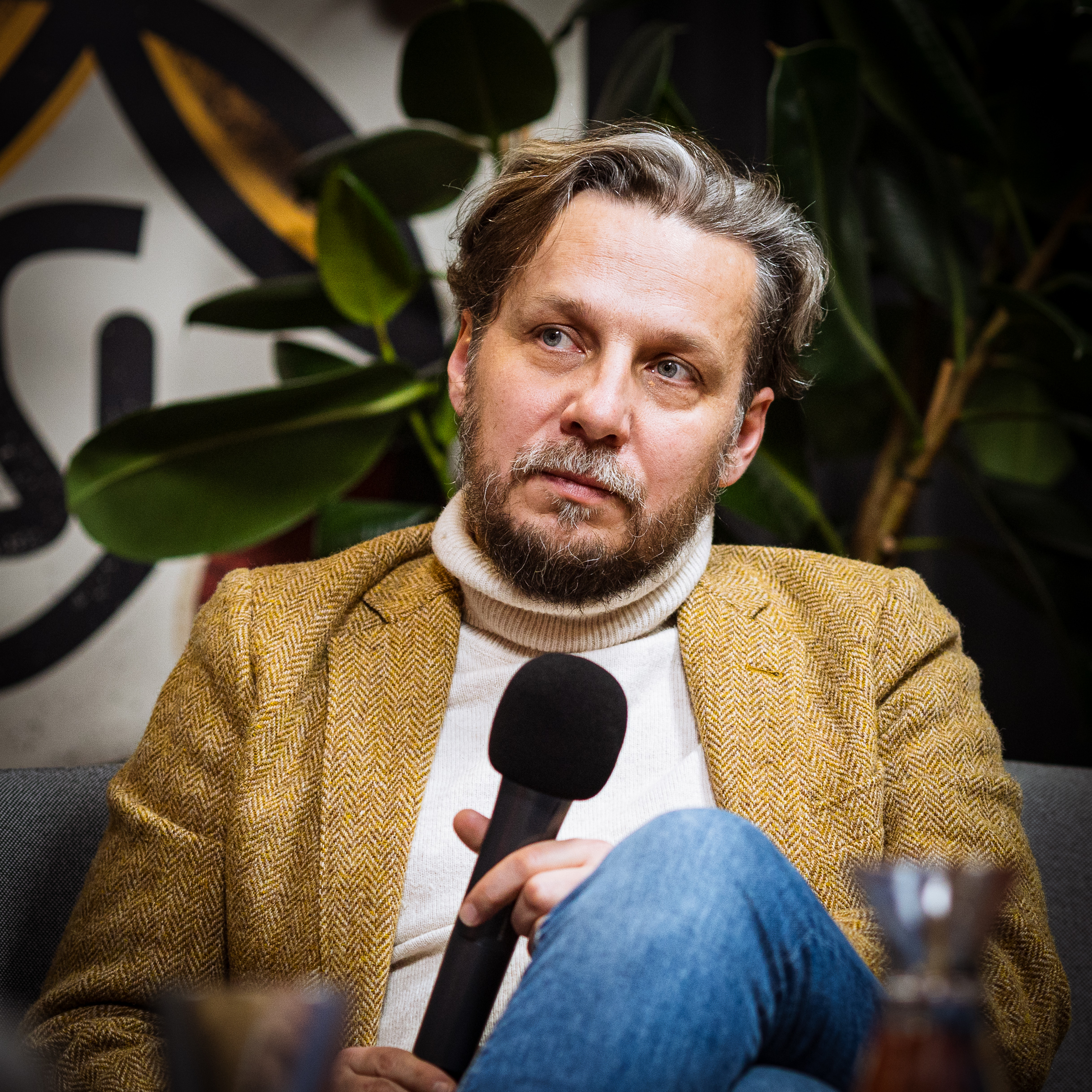
Wit Szostak (2023)

Dobrosław Kot better known by his pen name Wit Szostak (born 1976) is a Polish fantasy writer, philosopher, and historian of Polish music folklore. He has published fourteen novels and numerous short stories.

His 2008 short story Miasto grobów. Uwertura received the Janusz A. Zajdel Award.
