= Dobrogoszcz =

Dobrogoszcz may refer to the following places in Poland:

- Dobrogoszcz, Lower Silesian Voivodeship (south-west Poland)
- Dobrogoszcz, Wałcz County in West Pomeranian Voivodeship (north-west Poland)
- Dobrogoszcz, Podlaskie Voivodeship (north-east Poland)
- Dobrogoszcz, Pomeranian Voivodeship (north Poland)
- Dobrogoszcz, Szczecinek County in West Pomeranian Voivodeship (north-west Poland)
