= Leszyce =

- Village
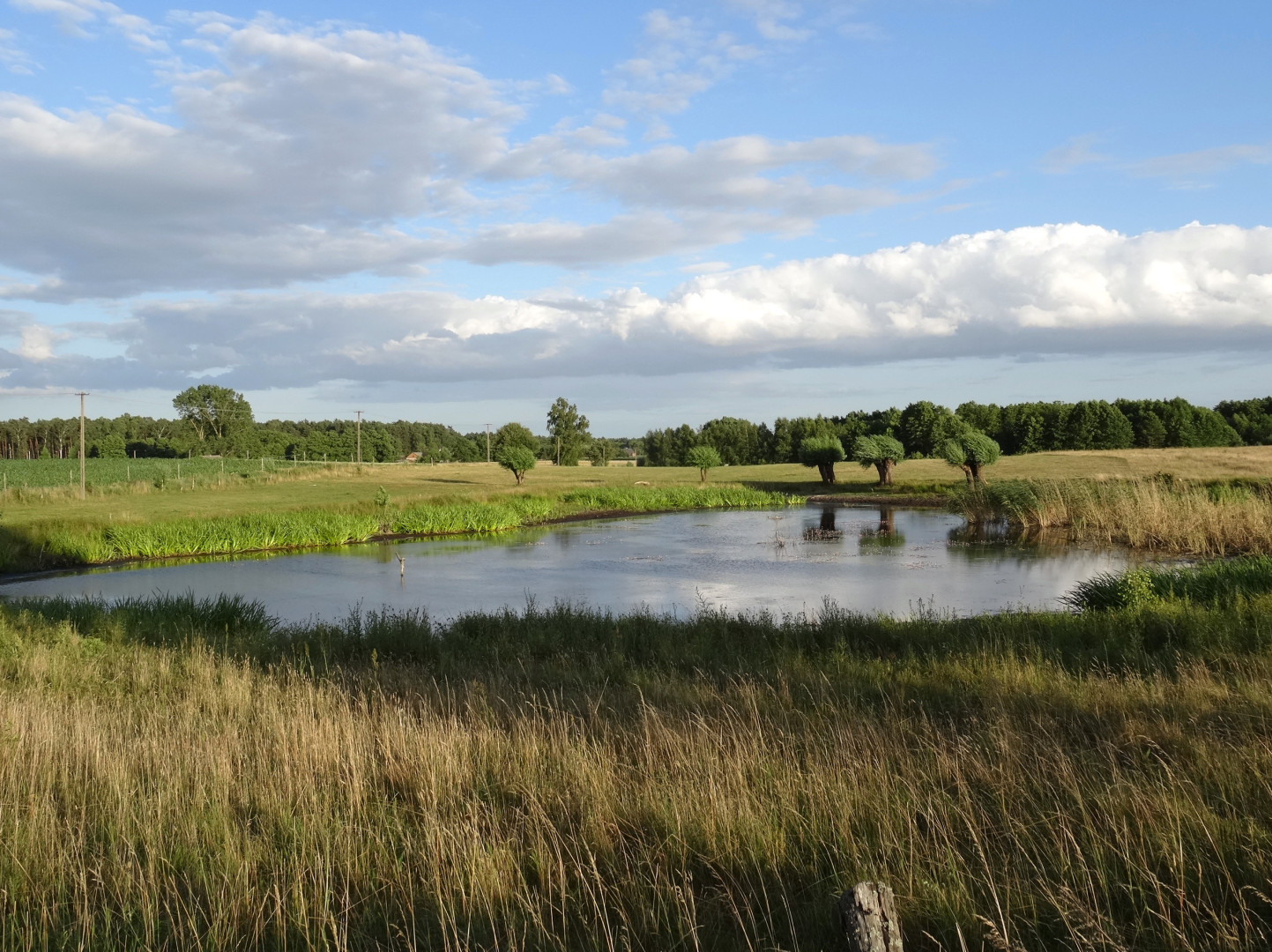
- Located in the Bydgoszcz Forest, the village of Leszyce

- Location within Poland
- Coordinates: 52°58′N 18°09′E
- Country: Poland
- Voivodeship: Kuyavian-Pomeranian
- County: Bydgoszcz
- Gmina: Nowa Wieś Wielka

Leszyce [lɛˈʂɨt͡sɛ] is a village in the administrative district of Gmina Nowa Wieś Wielka, within Bydgoszcz County, Kuyavian-Pomeranian Voivodeship, in north-central Poland.
