= Dobrogosty =

Dobrogosty may refer to the following places in Poland:

- Dobrogosty, Łódź Voivodeship (central Poland)
- Dobrogosty, Masovian Voivodeship (north-east Poland)
