= Dobrosav Milojević =

Serbian artist (born 1948)

- Born: 24 December 1948; Jagodina, Serbia
- Education: Museum of Naïve and Marginal Art in Jagodina
- Known for: Painting
- Movement: Naïve art
- Awards: ˝Grand prix of the Biennal of Naïve art˝

Dobrosav Milojević (born in Donje Štiplje near Jagodina in 1948) is a Serbian naïve painter. He lives and works in Donje Štiplje.

== Biography ==
The official start of his dealing with the naive art is since 1971, when he was admitted to the Museum of Naïve and Marginal Art in Jagodina. Since then, he is its constant member. In the last 40 years, he had a huge number of solo exhibitions in Serbia and around the world. He has a permanent exhibition of paintings in the Museum of Naive Art in Jagodina and his paintings can be seen in many galleries around the world: Museum of Naïve and Marginal Art, Gallery of Self-taught Artists in Trebnje, the Galleries in Sanski Most, Gallery of International Naïve Art (GINA) in Tel Aviv, Gallery of Naive Art in Kovačica, Gallery of Primitive and Folk Art, San Francisco. He has won several awards and plaques for his work.

== Art ==
He was interested in painting since early boyhood. As a child of the village he found inspiration in motifs that are related to village and life in it. While he lived in the city he felt strong nostalgie for the village and happy childhood days. This resulted in many of vividly pictures that depicted a beautiful landscape of mountains around the Crni Vrh (Jagodina), the mountain that marked his life and which he finally returned. Among the many affirmative opinions about his painting, the most important are:

- former President of the Serbian Academy of Sciences and Arts Dr. Dejan Medaković´s opinion (from the Dobrosav Milojević's Catalogue, Museum of Naïve Art, Jagodina, 1997),
- and Member of Department of Language and Literature of Serbian Academy of Sciences and Arts Dr. Vojislav J. Đurić's opinion (from speech at the opening of exhibition in Jagodina, 8 December 1993).

== Publications ==
=== Bibliography ===
- "World Encyclopedia of Naïve Art", Oto Bihalji-Merin, 1984, Belgrade, Yugoslavia
- "Yugoslavian Naïve Painters", 1991, Belgrade
- "Dobrosav Milojevic", K. Smiljkovic, 1993,
- ˝Dobrosav Milojevic Biography˝ - Gallery of International Naïve Art (GINA)
- "Naïve Art in Serbia", Jagodina, Yugoslavia
- "Naïve Art in Australia, Canada and Europe", Vasa Carapic, 1994, Melbourne
- "The Key to Making Dreams Come True", Koviljka Smiljkovic, 1999, Novi Sad
- "Fiction", Museum of Naïve and Marginal Art in Jagodina, 2003,
- "13th Biennial", Nina Krstic, Museum of Naïve and Marginal Art in Jagodina, Serbia, 2007.

== Some of Exhibitions ==
- 1973 Gallery of the Foreign Affairs Ministry Club, Belgrade
- 1974 Protocol Salon if the Ministry of Foreign Affairs
- 1974 Caldarese Gallery, Bologna, Italy
- 1974 International Book Fair, Brussels
- 1977 Gallery of the Foreign Affairs Ministry Club, Belgrade
- 1979 Arvil Gallery, Mexico
- 1980 Gallery of Primitive and Folk Art, San Francisco
- 1981 Motovun Publishers Group, Motovun
- 1982 Yugoslav Embassy, Prague
- 1986 Djura Jaksic's House, Skadarlija Gallery, Belgrade
- 1988 "3D", Janko Lisjak Gallery, Belgrade
- 1990 Casino Grand Cercle, Aix-Les-Bains
- 1991 Lionel Wendt Gallery, Sri Lanka
- 1991 Speranza Gallery, Belgrade
- 1993 Museum of Naïve and Marginal Art in Jagodina
- 1994 Konak Knjeginje Ljubice Museum, Belgrade
- 1994 Gallery of Naive Art in Kovačica,
- 1994 Plaza Hotel, Herceg Novi
- 1997 "Solo Exhibition", City Library, Belgrade
- 2000 "Solo Exhibition of paintings", Amien
- 2003 "Dobrosav Milojevic", Galerie de l'Espace Delvaux, Bruxelles
- 2008 "Guido Vedovato, Dobrosav Milojević", Instituto Italiano di Cultura, Belgrado
- 2010 "40 years of artistic creation, Exhibition of paintings", Gallery of Naive Art in Kovačica,
