= Emilianowo, Kuyavian-Pomeranian Voivodeship =

Emilianowo
- Village
- Location within Poland
- Coordinates: 53°3′N 18°6′E
- Country: Poland
- Voivodeship: Kuyavian-Pomeranian
- County: Bydgoszcz
- Gmina: Nowa Wieś Wielka

Emilianowo [ɛmiljaˈnɔvɔ] is a village in the administrative district of Gmina Nowa Wieś Wielka, within Bydgoszcz County, Kuyavian-Pomeranian Voivodeship, in north-central Poland.
