= Dobromierz, Kuyavian-Pomeranian Voivodeship =

Dobromierz
- Village
- Location within Poland
- Coordinates: 53°0′N 18°5′E
- Country: Poland
- Voivodeship: Kuyavian-Pomeranian
- County: Bydgoszcz
- Gmina: Nowa Wieś Wielka

Dobromierz [dɔˈbrɔmjɛʂ] is a village in the administrative district of Gmina Nowa Wieś Wielka, within Bydgoszcz County, Kuyavian-Pomeranian Voivodeship, in north-central Poland.
