= Dobroslava Menclová =

Czech art historian (1904–1978)

Dobroslava Menclová (née Vavroušková; 2 January 1904, Přerov – 19 November 1978, Sušice) was a Czech art historian and architect. She is best remembered for her two volume study on Czech castles titled České hrady (1972 and 1976).
