= Goncarzewy =

- Village
- Location within Poland
- Coordinates: 53°12′11″N 17°45′2″E
- Country: Poland
- Voivodeship: Kuyavian-Pomeranian
- County: Bydgoszcz
- Gmina: Sicienko

Goncarzewy [ɡɔnt͡saˈʐɛvɨ] (sometimes called Goncarzewo) is a village in the administrative district of Gmina Sicienko, within Bydgoszcz County, Kuyavian-Pomeranian Voivodeship, in north-central Poland.

== History ==
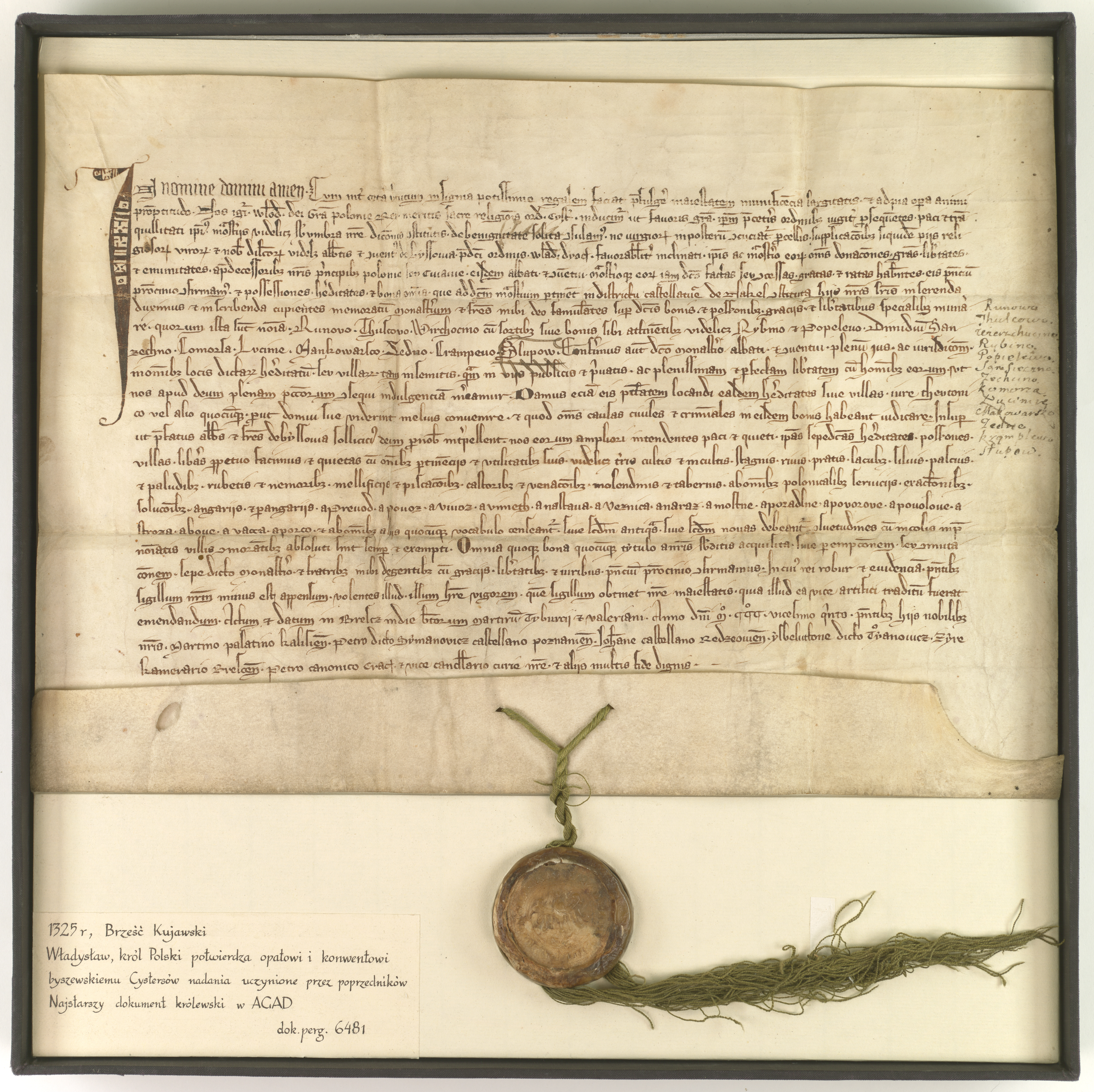
Edict issued by Wladyslaw, King of Poland confirms that the Cistercians of Byszewo will continue have the same privileges that previous leaders have offered them, as well as ownership of the Nakielska manor, as previously under German law with the addition of various freedoms.

Since 1288 Samsieczno and adjacent areas belonged to the Cistercian monks of Byszewo, although the village itself is not named in the monastery documents in 1386. The village was probably a retreat of Gunter of Bronikowa, a descendant of the Sorbian noble family Pradel (Predel), who arrived in the fourteenth century.

The first record of the name of the village appears in district court records of Nakło nad Notecią ("Nakel" in German) dated 4 August 1453, naming Jan de Guncerzewy (John from the village Guncerzewy). From the start the site was strongly "connected" with Samsieczno and its buildings were developed on the plan ulicówki. Since the beginning the village was owned by nobles who were under an obligation to participate in military expeditions.

Since the mid-fifteenth century the village was property of the Guncerzewskich family. In 1578 the village belonged to the family of Siedlce and Turzyńskich Szczutowskich. In the mid-seventeenth century, the village was taken over by the family Działyński. At the end of the seventeenth century, the heir was Michael Działyński, Lord of Chełm. At the beginning of the eighteenth century, the lands in the village go to the family Potuliccy. The last heiress of the village is Angela Constance Countess Alexander Potulicka.

On 20 October 1932 the village board passes under the "Potulicka Foundation", created by Angela Potulicka Potuliccy. During World War II the village was part of the Reichsgau Danzig-Westpreußen. After World War II, the assets of the Foundation Potulicka land was nationalized and became part of the village Agricultural Combine in Wojnowo.

Since 1990 the rural goods have been administered by the John Paul II Catholic University of Lublin (Universitas Catholica Lublinensis Ioannis Pauli II), as legal heirs to the "Potulicka Foundation".

== Notable residents ==
- Margarete Himmler (1893–1967), wife of Heinrich Himmler

== Etymology ==
The name of the village comes from the Sorbian name for Gunter. Its sounds different from the spelling and is phonetically similar to Gunczerz. The original name of the village Gunczerzewy has evolved over the years. Since the mid-fifteenth century to the partitions the name was recorded as: Guncerzewy, Gunczerzowy, Gunczerzewy, Guncerzewo, Gunczarzewy, Gącarzewy, Goncerzewo, Guncerzowy, Guncerzewice, Gunczerzewy. In the Grand Duchy of Posen there were two variations of the name: Gońcarzewy in Polish, and Goncerzewo in German. The Polish version Goncarzewy, which is currently in force, first appeared in 1926.

== Sources ==
- Teki Dworzaczka. Materiały historyczno-genealogiczne do dziejów szlachty wielkopolskiej XV-XX w. Biblioteka Kórnicka PAN 1995-2004
- Dzieje Ziemi Nakielskiej aż do pierwszego rozbioru Polski – ks. Ignacy Geppert. 1926.
- Powiat Nakielski w XVI wieku. Szkic geograficzno-historyczny – E. Callier. Poznań 1886
- Krajna i Nakło: studia i rozprawy wydane z okazji pięćdziesięciolecia gimnazjum im. Bolesława Krzywoustego w Nakle – W. Malicki, Wydział Powiatowy, Nakło; Wyrzysk, 1926
- Herbarz Polski, Wiadomości historyczno-genealogiczne o rodach szlacheckich Adam Boniecki – Marek Jerzy Manikowski Ph.D., publisher by Dr. Manikowski Publikacje Elektroniczne, Kraków, Poland 2005, ISBN 83-918058-3-2
- Fundacja Potulicka im. Anieli hr. Potulickiej 1925 – 1948, Jan Ziółek, Katolicki Uniwersytet Lubelski, ISBN 83-228-0697-3
