= Sicienko, Kuyavian-Pomeranian Voivodeship =

Sicienko
- Village
- Location within Poland
- Coordinates: 53°12′N 17°48′E
- Country: Poland
- Voivodeship: Kuyavian-Pomeranian
- County: Bydgoszcz
- Gmina: Sicienko
- Population: 653
- Website: http://sicienko.pl/

Sicienko [ɕiˈt͡ɕɛnkɔ] (German: Wilhelmsort) is a village in Bydgoszcz County, Kuyavian-Pomeranian Voivodeship, in north-central Poland. It is the seat of the gmina (administrative district) called Gmina Sicienko.

In 2006 the village had a population of 653.

Walther Wever (general), pre-war commander of the Luftwaffe, was born here.

== History ==
The area of the modern village has been inhabited at least since early Middle Ages, there were numerous archaeological finds in the area dated between 5th and 10th century. The village for most of its history shared the fate of the nearby city of Bydgoszcz, as well as the nearby village of Sitno. In the 19th century, when Poland was partitioned among Russia, Prussia and Austria, the area was part of Prussian province of West Prussia. Initially named "Małe Sitno" (lit. Little Sitno), its name was Germanised to "Klein Sittno", while the administrative division around it was named "Wilhelmsort". At the end of the 19th century the village had 18 houses and 237 inhabitants, as well as a post office and a Protestant church (built in 1887). After Poland regained her independence in 1918, the village was renamed to Sicienko (the name being a Polish diminutive of the name of the nearby village of Sitno). In 1935 it was administratively attached to Gmina Ślesin. After World War II it was attached to Dąbrówka Nowa, before being made a seat of a separate commune in 1972. September 7, 2013 "Metropolitans Toruń-Bydgoszcz" (reserve team of Angels Toruń and Bydgoszcz Archers) host in Sicienko PLFA8 football tournament.
