= Kruszyniec =

Kruszyniec may refer to the following places in Poland:

- Kruszyniec, Lower Silesian Voivodeship (south-west Poland)
- Kruszyniec, Kuyavian-Pomeranian Voivodeship (north-central Poland)
