= Margarete Himmler =

Wife of Heinrich Himmler

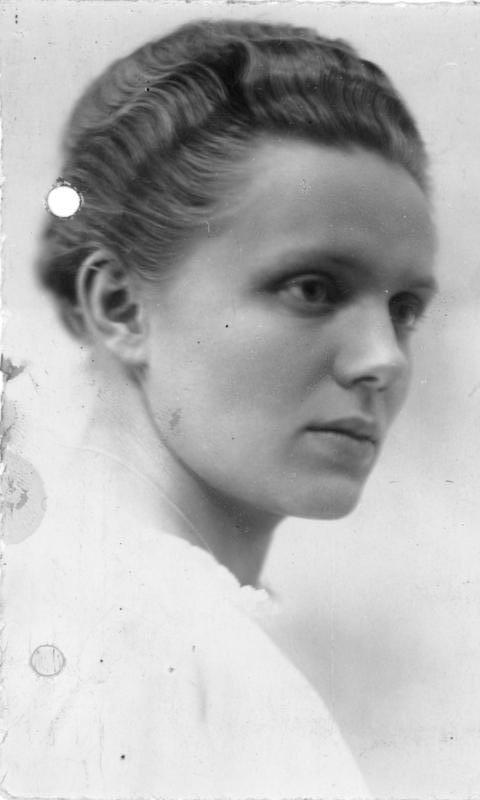
- Boden in 1918
- Born: Margarete Boden; 9 September 1893; Goncarzewo, near Bromberg, West Prussia, German Empire
- Died: 25 August 1967 (aged 73); Munich, West Germany
- Other names: Margarete Siegroth; Marga Himmler
- Occupation: Nurse
- Spouse: Heinrich Himmler (m. 1928; died 1945)
- Children: Gudrun Burwitz

Margarete "Marga" Himmler (née Boden; 9 September 1893 – 25 August 1967) was the wife of Reichsführer-SS Heinrich Himmler.

== Youth, first marriage, and divorce ==
Margarete Boden was born in Goncarzewo near Bromberg, the daughter of landowner Hans Boden and his wife Elfriede (née Popp). Margarete had three sisters (Elfriede, Lydia and Paula) and a brother. In 1909, she attended the Höhere Töchterschule (High School for Girls) in Bromberg, then a city in the German Empire (now Bydgoszcz, Poland). Margarete trained and worked as a nurse during the First World War followed by a stint at a German Red Cross hospital at the war's end.

Her first marriage was short and produced no children. Due to the economic support of her father, she was able to operate and direct a private nursing clinic in Berlin.

== Marriage to Heinrich Himmler ==
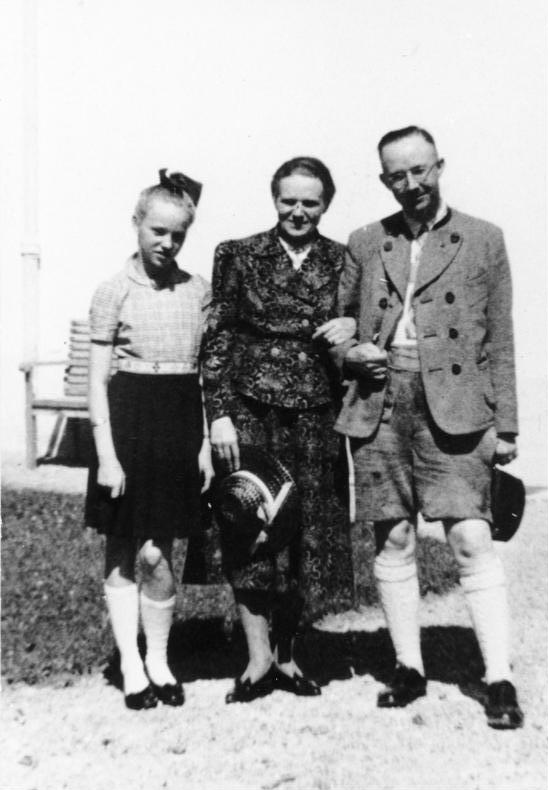
Margarete (middle) with Heinrich and daughter Gudrun

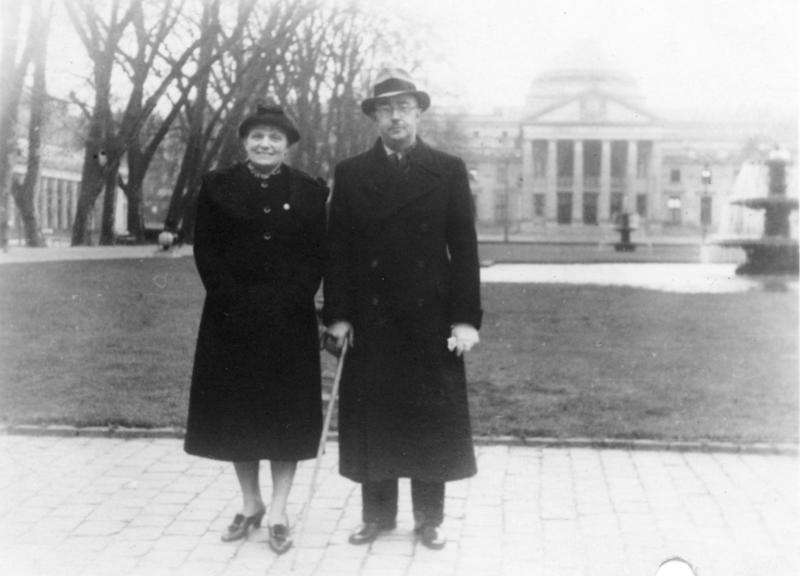
Margarete with her husband in front of the Kurhaus, Wiesbaden, in November/December 1936

Himmler met his future wife, Margarete Boden, in 1927. They met during one of his lecture tours and remained thereafter in written contact. In one surviving letter, Boden refers to Heinrich Himmler as the "Landsknecht with the hard heart" but she was nevertheless impressed by his romantic style of writing and his sincere love for her. The blonde, blue-eyed nurse corresponded perfectly to Heinrich Himmler's ideal woman.

Seven years his senior, Boden shared his interest in herbal medicine and homeopathy, and was part owner of a small private clinic. They shared an excessive propensity for efficiency, and neatness, longed for strict domesticity, and both preferred a parsimonious lifestyle. From her husband she received a consistent diet of anti-Semitism and diatribes against Communists and Freemasons. Her anti-Semitism was evident in a letter to Heinrich Himmler dated 22 June 1928, in which she made disparaging remarks about the co-owner of the private clinic in Berlin, gynecologist and surgeon Bernhard Hauschildt, exclaiming, "That Hauschildt! Those Jews are all the same!"

Heinrich and Margarete married in July 1928. Initially, Heinrich struggled with the decision to reveal his relationship with Margarete to his parents, partly due to her being seven years older, but also because she was a divorcee, and foremost, because she was a Protestant. None of Himmler's family members attended the wedding, so Heinrich's groomsmen were the father and brother of the bride. Ultimately, Heinrich Himmler's parents accepted Margarete, but the family kept their distance from her and remained that way throughout the length of the relationship. The couple had their only child, Gudrun, who was born on 8 August 1929; they were also foster parents to Gerhard von Ahe, the son of an SS officer who had died before the war. Margarete sold her share of the clinic and used the proceeds to buy a plot of land in Waldtrudering, near Munich, where they put up a prefabricated house. Himmler was constantly away on party business, so his wife took charge of their efforts—mostly unsuccessful—to raise livestock for sale. After the Nazis seized power in January 1933, the family moved first to Möhlstrasse in Munich, and in 1934 to Gmund am Tegernsee, where they bought a house.

Himmler later gained a large house in the Berlin suburb of Dahlem free of charge as an official residence. The couple now saw each other rarely as Himmler became absorbed by work. Gebhard, Heinrich Himmler's older brother, characterized Margarete as a "cool, hard woman with extremely delicate nerves who radiated no warmth at all and spent too much time moaning" who had, despite these characteristics, been an "exemplary housewife", one who devotedly loved Heinrich and remained true to her husband. Margarete Himmler joined the Nazi Party as early as 1928 (member number 97,252). Due to Himmler's enormous responsibilities, the relationship with Marga was strained. The couple did unite for social functions; they were frequent guests at the home of Reinhard Heydrich. Margarete saw it as her duty to invite the wives of the senior SS leaders over for coffee and tea on Wednesday afternoons. Despite her best efforts and the fact that Margarete was married to the Reichsführer-SS, she remained unpopular in SS circles. Former Hitler Youth leader Baldur von Schirach wrote in his memoirs that Heinrich Himmler was constantly "henpecked", essentially had zero influence at home, and had to yield to Margarete's will.

During the Nuremberg Rally in 1938, Himmler had conflicts with most of the wives of the highest-ranking SS leaders, who as a group refused to take any directions from her. According to Heydrich's biographers and historian Robert Gerwarth, Lina Heydrich harbored a "violent dislike" of Margarete Himmler, which was probably reciprocated. After the war, Lina Heydrich made disparaging comments to a reporter from Der Spiegel. Margarete was described as a "narrow-minded, humorless, blonde-haired woman" who suffered from agoraphobia.

Hedwig Potthast, Himmler's young secretary starting in 1936, became his mistress by 1938. She left her job in 1941. Himmler fathered two children with her: a son, Helge (born 1942), and a daughter, Nanette Dorothea (born 1944 at Berchtesgaden). Margarete, by then living in the town of Gmund am Tegernsee in Bavaria with her daughter, learned of the relationship sometime in 1941. Margarete and Himmler were already separated, and she decided to tolerate the relationship for the sake of her daughter.

== Second World War ==
Once World War II began, Himmler helped operate a military hospital affiliated with the German Red Cross. By December 1939, she was supervising the Red Cross hospitals in Military District III (Berlin-Brandenburg). In this position, she led missions into the territories and countries occupied by the German Wehrmacht. In March 1940, Margarete recorded a business trip to German-occupied Poland, so she was certainly a witness to events there. In her journals, written while serving, Himmler wrote, "Then I was in Posen, Łódź and Warsaw. This Jewish rabble, Polacks, most of them don't look like human beings and the dirt is indescribable. It's an incredible job trying to create order there."

For her efforts, Himmler reached the rank of colonel in the German Red Cross. In February 1945, in writing to Gebhard Himmler, Margarete said of Heinrich, "How wonderful that he has been called to great tasks and is equal to them. The whole of Germany is looking to him."

Heinrich Himmler was close to his first daughter, Gudrun, whom he nicknamed Püppi ("dolly"); he phoned her every few days and visited as often as he could. Hedwig and Margarete both remained loyal to Himmler. Margarete and Heinrich Himmler last saw one another in April 1945, sharing time together with Gudrun at their Gmund residence.

== Post-war ==
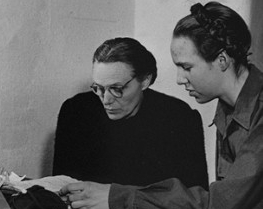
Margarete Himmler (left) with daughter Gudrun in Allied internment during the Nuremberg Trials in Nuremberg, 24 November 1945

In 1945, Margarete and Gudrun left Gmund as Allied troops advanced into the area. After the invasion of Bolzano, Italy, by the U.S. Army in May 1945, Margarete and Gudrun were arrested. They were held in various internment camps in Italy, France, and Germany. During her internment, Margarete was interrogated, but it became clear that she was not informed of the official business of her husband, and was described as having a "small-town mentality" which persisted throughout her questioning.

In September 1945, Margarete Himmler was again interrogated, but this time it was during the Nuremberg trials. Margarete and Gudrun were then detained at the Flak-Kaserne Ludwigsburg internment camp. Since they were not accused, she and Gudrun were released in November 1946 from internment. They took refuge for a time with the Bethel Institution of Bielefeld. Margarete's stay there was expressly endorsed by the executive board of the Bethel Institution, but this was not without controversy. On 4 June 1947, in the European edition of the New-York Tribune, an article appeared entitled, "Widow of Heinrich Himmler Lives Like a Gentlewoman".

Margarete was categorized in 1948 at Bielefeld as a lesser offender (Category III) and was to be denazified accordingly. In 1950, Margarete retained a lawyer to challenge this classification, since she claimed that her early Nazi Party membership was no more than "nominal" and that her high rank resulted from her early service with the German Red Cross, in which she had served since 1914. Margarete maintained that while she had been the wife of the Reichsführer-SS, she remained far from the spotlight. Nevertheless, the denazification committee in Detmold revised her classification and contended that she likely supported the goals of the Nazi Party and endorsed the actions of her husband. Her lawyer insisted during the follow-on appeals process that Margarete could not be held responsible for the actions of her husband and countered that the official decision was guided by the idea of Sippenhaft, which meant she was responsible by familial connections. On 19 March 1951, she was finally classified as a Nazi sympathizer (Category IV: Mitläuferin).

According to this judgment, she was not to be held accountable for the crimes of her husband, despite that she had not been distant from them. Additional arguments were presented that she and her daughter had benefited from the rise of her husband. Because of this, another denazification proceeding, started by the Bavarian Prime Minister Hans Ehard, resumed in the British occupation zone. These proceedings focused on the unresolved question of ownership of Margarete and Heinrich's home in Gmund. On 15 January 1953, at the final hearing against Margarete in Munich, she was classified as a beneficiary of the Nazi regime and thus placed in Category II (Activists, Militants, and Profiteers, or Incriminated Persons/German: Belastete), and sentenced to 30 days' special/punitive work. She also lost her pension rights and the right to vote.

Gudrun left Bethel in 1952. From the autumn of 1955, Margarete lived with her sister Lydia in Heepen. Her adopted son Gerhard also lived with them in her apartment. Margarete's final years were spent with her daughter in Munich. Gudrun emerged from the experience embittered by her alleged mistreatment and remained devoted to her father's memory.

Margarete Himmler died in 1967.

== Assessment ==
Peter Longerich notes that Margarete Himmler probably did not know about the official secrets or planned projects of her husband during the Nazi era. She said after the war she did not have any knowledge of Nazi crimes, but she remained a committed National Socialist and was certainly antisemitic. Jürgen Matthäus described her as a typical Nazi who wanted the Jews gone, and observed that despite any efforts contrariwise to isolate herself from the regime and its crimes, she profited from them.

== See also ==
- List of Nazi Party leaders and officials
- Women in Nazi Germany

== Bibliography ==
- Flaherty, T. H. (2004) [1988]. The Third Reich: The SS. Time-Life Books, Inc. ISBN 1-84447-073-3.
- Gerwarth, Robert (2011). Hitler's Hangman: The Life of Heydrich. New Haven, CT: Yale University Press. ISBN 978-0-300-11575-8.
- Himmler, Katrin (2014). Michael Wildt (Hrsg.): Himmler privat. Briefe eines Massenmörders. Piper, München. ISBN 978-3-492-05632-8. (not revised)
- Himmler, Katrin (2007). The Himmler Brothers. London: Pan Macmillan. ISBN 978-0-330-44814-7.
- Longerich, Peter (2012). Heinrich Himmler: A Life. Oxford; New York: Oxford University Press. ISBN 978-0-19-959232-6.
- Manvell, Roger; Fraenkel, Heinrich (2007) [1965]. Heinrich Himmler: The Sinister Life of the Head of the SS and Gestapo. London; New York: Greenhill; Skyhorse. ISBN 978-1-60239-178-9.
- Matthäus, Jürgen: „Es war sehr nett“. Auszüge aus dem Tagebuch der Margarete Himmler, 1937–1945 (pdf; 7,92 MB). In: Werkstatt Geschichte 25 (2000), pp. 75–93.
- Staff (2 December 2010). "Shadowy Nazi support group still honours daughter of SS head". sify.com. Archived from the original on 6 February 2013.
- Wittler, Christina. Leben im Verborgenen. Die Witwe des „Reichsführers SS“ Heinrich Himmler Margarete Himmler (1893–1967) In: Bärbel Sunderbrink (Hrsg.): Frauen in der Bielefelder Geschichte. Verlag für Regionalgeschichte, Bielefeld 2010, ISBN 978-3-89534-795-5, pp. 193–205.
- Himmler, Katrin & Michael Wildt (Hrsg.). Himmler privat. Briefe eines Massenmörders. Piper, München. 2014, ISBN 978-3-492-05632-8. (nicht ausgewertet)
- Himmler, Katrin. Die Brüder Himmler. Eine deutsche Familiengeschichte. S. Fischer, Frankfurt a. M. 2005, ISBN 3-10-033629-1.
- Longerich, Peter. Heinrich Himmler. Biographie, Siedler, München 2008, ISBN 978-3-88680-859-5.
