= Kruszyn, Bydgoszcz County =

Kruszyn
- Village
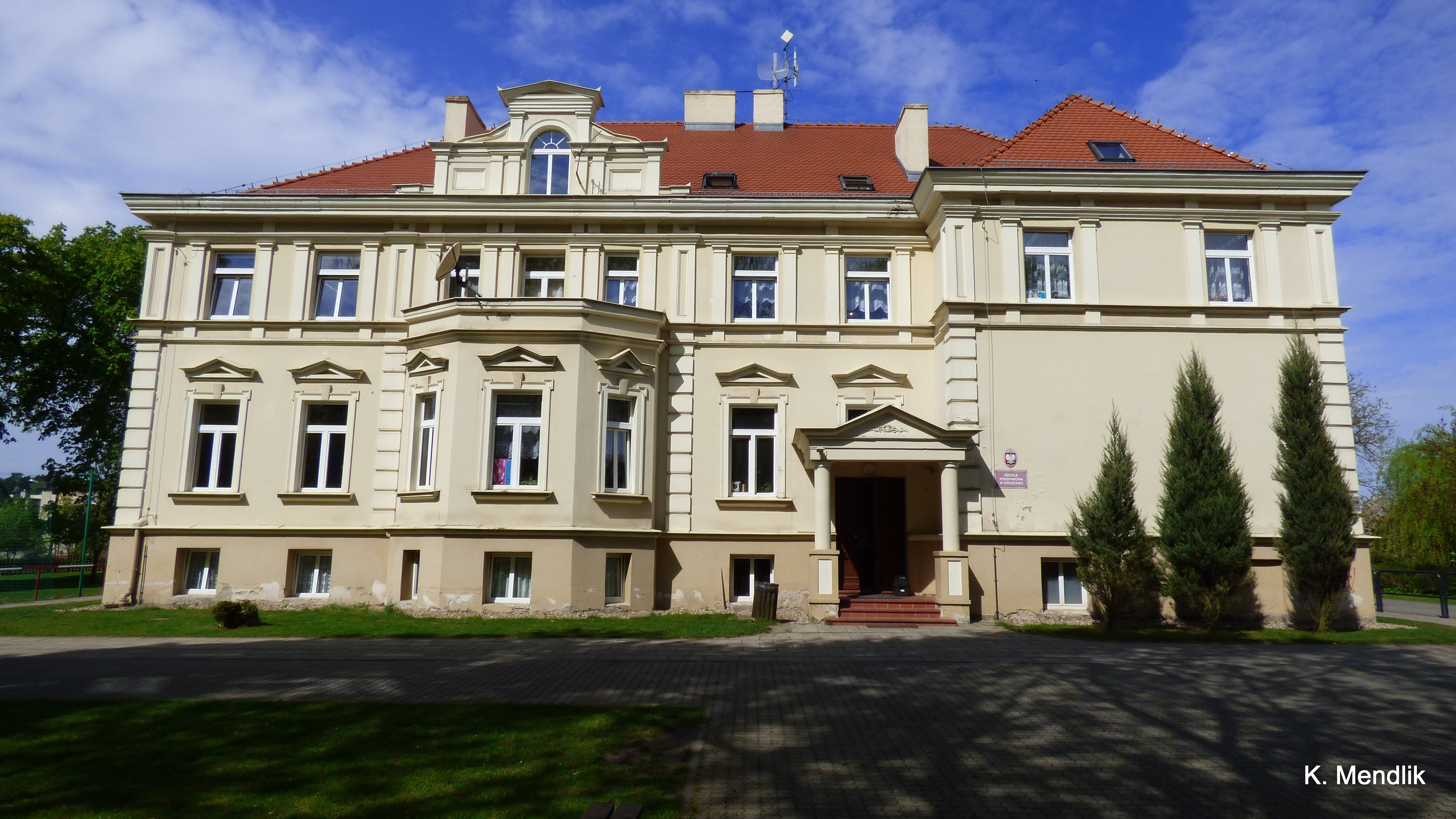
- Manor in Kruszyn, now a primary school

- Location within Poland
- Coordinates: 53°9′N 17°51′E
- Country: Poland
- Voivodeship: Kuyavian-Pomeranian
- County: Bydgoszcz
- Gmina: Sicienko

Kruszyn [ˈkruʂɨn] is a village in the administrative district of Gmina Sicienko, within Bydgoszcz County, Kuyavian-Pomeranian Voivodeship, in north-central Poland.

== History ==
In the middle of the 17th century was Melchjor Krusiński the owner of the estate. After his death Kruszyn and Pawłówek inherited his daughter Anna Krusińska, who was married to the Ludwik Lewalt Jezierski. The family entered the possessions in 1642 to Świętosław Orzelski, the son of Aleksander Orzelski. After 1720 the village was bought by Count Wojciech Bniński In the middle of the 19th century the family Bniński sold the property to Hipolit Grabowski. In the end of the century it belonged to the German family Weckwarth. In 1905, the estate of the widow Boltz was passed to Prussian Settlement Commission, which has settled 26 families here. On 23 October 1911 the estate was converted from estate district Adlig Kruschin in the municipality Kruschdorf.
