= Osowa Góra =

Osowa Góra may refer to:

- Osowa Góra (Bydgoszcz district), a district in Bydgoszcz, Poland
- Osowa Góra, Kuyavian-Pomeranian Voivodeship, a village in north-central Poland
- Osowa Góra, Pomeranian Voivodeship, a village in north Poland
