= Potthast =

Potthast is a German surname. Notable people with the surname include:

- August Potthast (1824–1898), German medieval historian and librarian
- Dan Potthast (born 1972), American guitarist, vocalist, songwriter
- Edward Henry Potthast (1857–1927), American impressionist painter
- Hedwig Potthast (1912–1994), German private secretary and mistress of Reichsführer-SS Heinrich Himmler
