= Dąbrówka Nowa Massacre =

- Location: Dąbrówka Nowa, Poland
- Date: 22 January 1945
- Attack type: Massacre
- Deaths: 100+ Latvian POWs of the 15th Waffen Grenadier Division of the SS (1st Latvian)
- Perpetrator: Red Army

The Dąbrówka Nowa Massacre occurred on 22 January 1945 in Dąbrówka Nowa in Poland, when a unit of the Red Army advancing from Nakło to Bydgoszcz killed over 100 unarmed members of the 15th Waffen Grenadier Division of the SS (1st Latvian).

== Events ==
On 22 January 1945, soldiers of the 5th Battalion of the 1st Construction Regiment of the 15th Waffen Grenadier Division of the SS (1st Latvian) were marching in the direction of Sępólno Krajeńskie after a rest in Dąbrówka Nowa. Along the way, they encountered a column of Soviet troops who mistook the Latvians for a unit holding combatant status. The Red Army troops immediately opened fire. Those who attempted to surrender were killed on the spot. About sixty of the Latvian soldiers fled to Dąbrówka Nowa, where they barricaded themselves in the schoolhouse. The building was surrounded and levelled by three tanks of the Soviet 9th Tank Corps. The remains of the SS troops lay for over a week in the snow, until at the request of the villagers they were buried at the boundary of the cemetery. In July 2010, fifty-three bodies were exhumed from that place and re-buried at the cemetery in Stare Czarnowo in north-western Poland, fifty-one Latvian soldiers, and two Germans.
