= Trzemiętówko =

- Village
- Location within Poland
- Coordinates: 53°15′N 17°48′E
- Country: Poland
- Voivodeship: Kuyavian-Pomeranian
- County: Bydgoszcz
- Gmina: Sicienko

Trzemiętówko [tʂɛmjɛnˈtufkɔ] is a village in the administrative district of Gmina Sicienko, within Bydgoszcz County, Kuyavian-Pomeranian Voivodeship, in north-central Poland.
