= Smolary, Kuyavian-Pomeranian Voivodeship =

Smolary
- Village
- Location within Poland
- Coordinates: 53°13′26″N 17°48′42″E
- Country: Poland
- Voivodeship: Kuyavian-Pomeranian
- County: Bydgoszcz
- Gmina: Sicienko

Smolary [smɔˈlarɨ] is a village in the administrative district of Gmina Sicienko, within Bydgoszcz County, Kuyavian-Pomeranian Voivodeship, in north-central Poland.
