= Stille Hilfe =

20th-century pro-Waffen-SS lobbying group in West Germany

- Formation: 1951
- Type: Aid
- Legal status: Organization
- Purpose: Assistance for prisoners of war and interned persons.
- Headquarters: Wuppertal
- Location: North Rhine-Westphalia, Germany
- Region served: International
- Official language: German
- Affiliations: ODESSA, Union Movement, HIAG

Die Stille Hilfe für Kriegsgefangene und Internierte (English: "Silent assistance for prisoners of war and interned persons"), abbreviated Stille Hilfe, is a relief organization for arrested, condemned and fugitive SS members, similar to the veterans' association HIAG, set up by Helene Elisabeth Princess von Isenburg (1900–1974) in 1951. The organization has come under criticism for its encouragement and support of neo-Nazis. It has also garnered a reputation for being shrouded in secrecy and thus remains a source of speculation.

== History ==
Operating covertly since 1946, the organization that later became publicly active as "Stille Hilfe" aided the escape of hunted Nazi fugitives, particularly to South America. Thus Adolf Eichmann, Johann von Leers, Walter Rauff and Josef Mengele could escape to Argentina.

== Establishment ==
After the main exponents of the later association had already long formed an active network, it was decided a non-profit association should be formed primarily to facilitate a donations campaign. On 7 October 1951 the founders' meeting was held in Munich and on 15 November 1951 the organization was entered in the register of associations in the Upper Bavarian city Wolfratshausen. The first president, Helene Elizabeth, Princess von Isenburg, was chosen because of her good contacts in the aristocracy and conservative upper middle-class circles as well as the Catholic Church. Founding members of the committee included church representatives Theophil Wurm and Johannes Neuhäusler, as well as high-ranking former functionaries of the Nazi state such as the former SS-Standartenführer and head of department in the Central Reich Security Office (RSHA), Wilhelm Spengler, and SS-Obersturmbannführer Heinrich Malz, who was the personal adviser of Ernst Kaltenbrunner.

== Objectives and activity in the mid-1950s ==
Helene Elisabeth, Princess von Isenburg explained its objectives in this way: "From the start of its efforts‚ the Stille Hilfe sought to take care of, above all, the serious needs of the prisoners of war and those interned completely without rights. Later their welfare service was active for those accused and arrested as a result of the war trials, whether in the prisons of the victors or in German penal institutions".

From the beginning of the Nuremberg Trials, the group sought to influence public opinion to prevent the death penalty. In press campaigns, personal and open letters and petitions, the accused were usually represented as innocent victims–merely those taking commands, irreproachable and having a blind faith in the Führer–who would have to suffer bitter injustice by victor's justice.

Because Princess von Isenburg was particularly devoted to the Nazi war criminals who were condemned to death in Landsberg Prison, which was under the jurisdiction of the United States military, she was affectionately known as "Mother of the Landsbergers" in order to let "Stille Hilfe" be seen primarily as a charitable organisation. The group also sought to free all of the Nazi war criminals being held in Werl Prison and Wittlich Prison, which were under the jurisdiction of the British military and the French military, respectively. They also sent more representatives to Paris (the French were holding additional Nazi war criminals under civilian law), Luxembourg, Belgium, and the Netherlands to lobby to free Nazi war criminals being held there.

The legal assistance for arrested war criminals was first organised by the attorney Rudolf Aschenauer (1913–1983), who also formulated and submitted requests for grace and revisions. The organisation paid vacation, dismissal and Christmas benefits to the prisoners and also supported their families. They were not only limited to humanitarian activities but also pursued ideological and revisionist objectives.

Princess Isenburg, a strict Catholic, tirelessly pleaded the criminals' cause in conservative circles and with high-ranking church representatives (even up to the Pope). Johannes Neuhäusler (1888–1973) in particular, who not only had suffered detention/imprisonment by the Gestapo, but also had been held by the Nazis in the Dachau concentration camp as a special prisoner, was most effective in public opinion, even among western Allied officials. The motives of the bishops lay probably less in a conscious ideological identification with the war criminals, but rather in the effort regarding reconciliation with the German past and the start of the new post-war society in West Germany. Neuhäusler explained that he wanted to repay "the bad with good". The further connections of Princess Isenburg and Aschenauer led particularly to former SS organisations such as Gauleiterkreis under Werner Naumann, which was already partly formed in Allied prisoner-of-war camps. Princess Isenburg initiated a whole series of organisations as "The working group for the rescue of the Landsberger prisoners", who were essentially financed by the churches.

== Activities since the 1950s ==
The churches to a large extent withdrew support with the end of the main Nuremberg Trials and the release of the time-serving Nazi war criminals from Landsberg in 1958.

In the following decades Stille Hilfe worked somewhat in secret with revisionist organizations and prominent protagonists of the "Auschwitzlüge" (Auschwitz lie) like Thies Christophersen and Manfred Roeder and co-operated with relevant foreign organizations and personalities e.g. (Florentine Rost van Tonningen, Léon Degrelle). By a not insignificant number of inheritances and by regular donations, the organization controls considerable funds. Since Stille Hilfe does not publish end-of-year figures, one can only estimate the influx of capital; however, perhaps donations (not including inheritances) were annually circa €60,000 to €80,000, at least to the end of the 1990s.

Stille Hilfe supported the condemned in the Düsseldorfer Majdanek trials, the former concentration camp guard Hildegard Lächert ("bloody Brygida") and later Klaus Barbie, Erich Priebke and Josef Schwammberger, who from 1942 to 1944 was commander of German labour camps in occupied Poland, involved in the massacres of Przemyśl and Rozwadów. Whether they were involved in the release of Herbert Kappler from a prison in Rome in 1977 is not clarified. Chairmen after Princess Isenburg (until 1959) were to 1992 the former Bund Deutscher Mädel leaders Gertrude Herr and Adelheid Klug.

They have been led since 1992 by Horst Janzen. The organisation today has approximately 40 members with decreasing numbers. At the same time however contacts were reinforced with "Hilfsorganisation für nationale politische Gefangene und deren Angehörige" (relief organization for national political prisoners) (HNG), so continuity may be secured.

Based until 1976 in Bremen Osterholz, since 1989 in Rotenburg an der Wümme, since 1992 in Wuppertal. In 1993–94 it caused a political debate in the Bundestag over its non-profit status as a revisionistic right-wing extremist association and was submitted to an examination by the fiscal authorities. In the Federal Fiscal Court (Bundesfinanzhof) it was decided in November 1999 to deny Stille Hilfe charitable status.

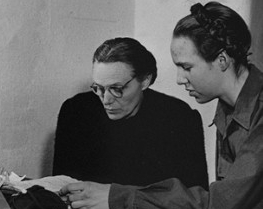
Leading member Gudrun Burwitz (right), daughter of top Nazi official Heinrich Himmler, with her mother at the International Military Tribunal trial of war criminals at Nuremberg, 1945

For years they had a prominent symbol: Gudrun Burwitz, the daughter of Heinrich Himmler. Known to her father as "Püppi", she was an idol to Stille Hilfe and their affiliates. At meetings such as Ulrichsbergtreffen in Austria she appeared at the same time as a star and an authority. Burwitz campaigned intensively in the last few years for accused Nazis. This particularly showed up in the case of Anton Malloth, who had lived undisturbed for about 40 years in Meran. He was proven guilty for his acts as a supervisor in the Gestapo-prison "Kleine Festung Theresienstadt", which was part of the larger Theresienstadt concentration camp. In 2001 Malloth was convicted by the district court of Munich for murder and attempted murder and sentenced to life imprisonment after the public prosecutor's office in Munich had taken over the procedure of the public prosecutor's office in Dortmund, which for many years had hijacked the procedure. From 1988 to 2000, Malloth lived in Pullach near Munich. Gudrun Burwitz was instructed by Stille Hilfe to rent a comfortable room for him in a home for the aged, which was built on a lot formerly owned by Rudolf Hess. In common with the secretive nature of the organisation, Burwitz did not give press interviews.

At the end of the 1990s it became public that the social welfare assistance administration (and thus the German taxpayers) had in large part taken over the considerable running costs of the home where Malloth was staying. This, along with the participation of Gudrun Burwitz, resulted in substantial public criticism.

Although firmly rooted in the neo-Nazi fringe, it developed amicable relations with conservative West German politicians, such as CDU Bundestag Parliamentary leader Alfred Dregger, who praised the efforts of Stille Hilfe in 1989.

In 1991, a Stille Hilfe representative attended the graveside ceremony in Kassel of Michael Kühnen, the prominent Neo-Nazi leader who died of HIV-related complications. Stille Hilfe laid a wreath that bore the SS motto "Michael Kühnen – his honour is loyalty."

The organisation has come under criticism for its encouragement and support of neo-Nazis. This has included legal aid for those facing prosecution. It also supports a Protestant old people's home in Pullach, near Munich.
