= Chmielewo, Kuyavian-Pomeranian Voivodeship =

Chmielewo
- Village
- Location within Poland
- Coordinates: 53°13′55″N 17°50′0″E
- Country: Poland
- Voivodeship: Kuyavian-Pomeranian
- County: Bydgoszcz
- Gmina: Sicienko

Chmielewo [xmjɛˈlɛvɔ] is a village in the administrative district of Gmina Sicienko, within Bydgoszcz County, Kuyavian-Pomeranian Voivodeship, in north-central Poland.
