= Teresin, Kuyavian-Pomeranian Voivodeship =

Teresin
- Village
- Location within Poland
- Coordinates: 53°12′2″N 17°43′36″E
- Country: Poland
- Voivodeship: Kuyavian-Pomeranian
- County: Bydgoszcz
- Gmina: Sicienko
- Population: 270

Teresin (Polish pronunciation: [tɛˈrɛɕin]) is a village in the administrative district of Gmina Sicienko, within Bydgoszcz County, Kuyavian-Pomeranian Voivodeship, in north-central Poland.
