= Słupowo =

- Village
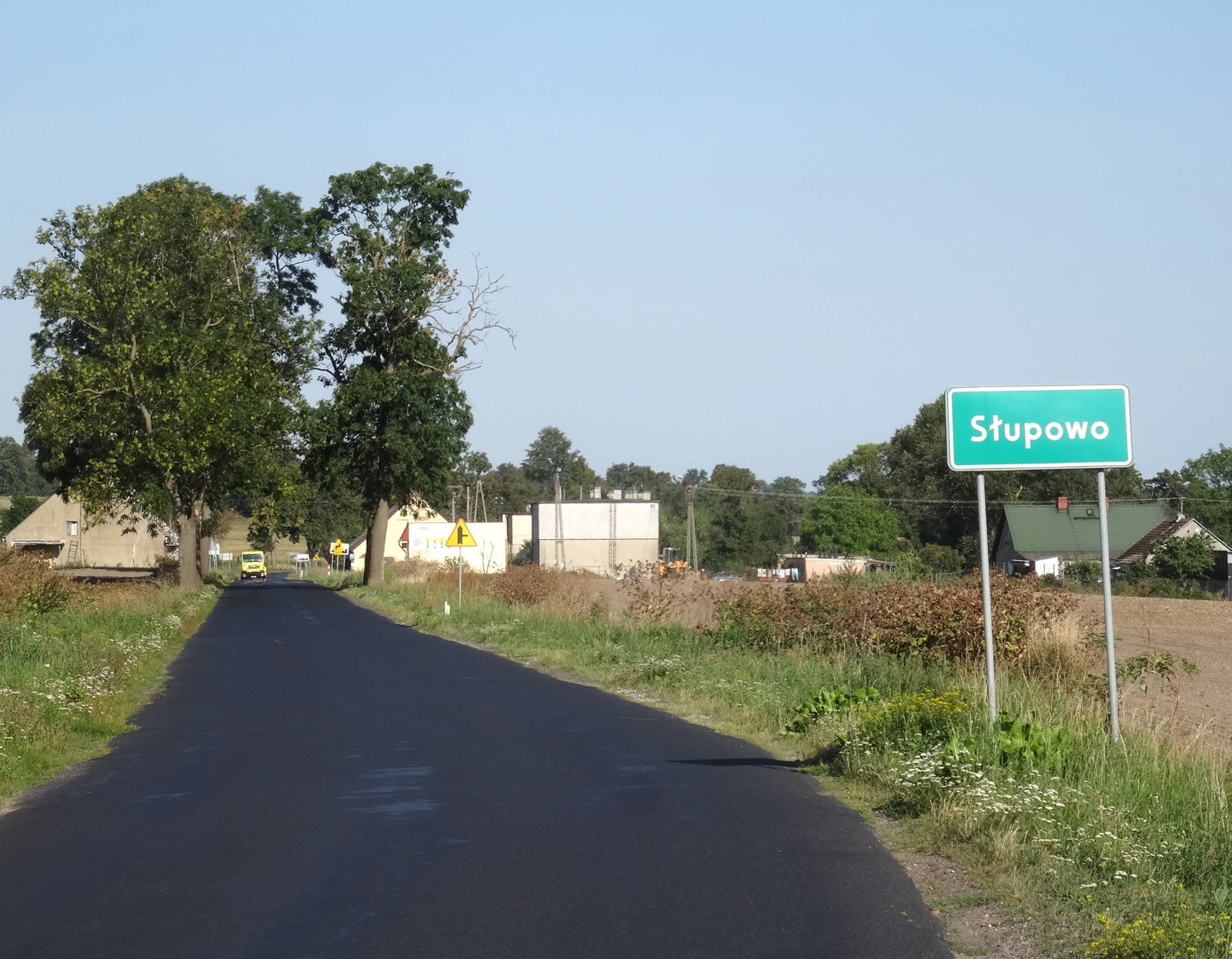
- Entering Słupowo

- Location within Poland
- Coordinates: 53°15′16″N 17°42′50″E
- Country: Poland
- Voivodeship: Kuyavian-Pomeranian
- County: Bydgoszcz
- Gmina: Sicienko
- Population: 200

Słupowo [swuˈpɔvɔ] is a village in the administrative district of Gmina Sicienko, within Bydgoszcz County, Kuyavian-Pomeranian Voivodeship, in north-central Poland.
