= Anton Malloth =

Austrian-German war criminal (1912–2002)

- Born: 13 February 1912; Schenna, Tyrol, Austria-Hungary (now South Tyrol, Italy)
- Died: 31 October 2002 (aged 90); Munich, Germany
- Military career
- Allegiance: Nazi Germany
- Branch: Gestapo
- Service years: 1940–1945
- Conflicts: World War II

Anton Malloth (13 February 1912 – 31 October 2002) was a supervisor in the Gestapo prison Kleine Festung, part of the Theresienstadt concentration camp, between June 1940 and May 1945. His nickname was der schöne Toni ("handsome Tony"). He was convicted of beating at least 100 prisoners to death and sentenced to life imprisonment in 2001, after escaping justice for 55 years.

== Life ==
Malloth grew up in the town of Schenna, near Merano, in South Tyrol. His foster parents ran a small agricultural business and guesthouse. He did an apprenticeship as a butcher and later became a lance corporal in the Italian army, opting to serve in Germany. In Innsbruck he received training with the Schutzpolizei (a uniformed branch of the Third Reich's police force) and later volunteered for police service in Prague. For most of the Second World War, Malloth worked in Theresienstadt.

=== Life in Austria ===
After the end of war, Malloth went on the run for some time, living at his parents-in-laws' home in Wörgl, Tyrol. In early 1948, Malloth was arrested by the Austrian police. During interrogation in front of a judge in Innsbruck, he played down his role in the Gestapo prison and denied having been involved with torture and murder.

An application for extradition by the Czechoslovak government was ignored by the Austrian justice department. Malloth was tried in absentia in September 1948 in Czechoslovakia for war crimes in Theresienstadt, but by then Malloth had already been released by the Austrian court. After numerous witness testimonials, the Czechoslovak court in Litoměřice ruled that there was no doubt that Malloth had beaten to death about 100 detainees. The verdict was reversed in 1969, but the application for extradition was still pending.

From 1948 to 1988 Malloth lived undisturbed in Merano. In 1952 he became an Italian citizen. When his Italian citizenship was stripped, he became a German citizen in 1957.

In spite of several applications for extradition by Germany and Austria, the German consulate in Milan issued him new passports as the previous ones expired. When he was expelled to Germany in 1988, the public prosecution department of Dortmund denied any extradition to Austria or Czechoslovakia. As there were no preliminary proceedings against Malloth, he was freed.

=== Life in Germany ===
From 1988 to 2000, Malloth lived in Pullach near Munich. Gudrun Burwitz, the daughter of Heinrich Himmler, was instructed by the Stille Hilfe to rent a comfortable room for him in a home for the aged, which was built on land formerly owned by Rudolf Hess.

When it became public in the late nineties that the social welfare office had paid most of the expenses of Malloth's room, there was much criticism in the German media. The involvement of Himmler's daughter Gudrun Burwitz was also criticized.

==== Arrest and trial ====
Malloth was taken into custody on 25 May 2000 and charged by the public prosecution department in Munich. The trial started on 23 April 2001 in the prison in Munich-Stadelheim. On 30 May 2001 Malloth was convicted by the district court of Munich for murder and attempted murder and sentenced to life imprisonment. In late 2002, cancer-suffering Malloth was declared unfit for prison and released, only ten days before his death.

== Literature ==
- Oliver Schröm/ Andrea Röpke. Stille Hilfe für braune Kameraden. Ch. Links Verlag, 2002. ISBN 978-3-86153-231-6
- Ernst Klee. Was sie taten - Was sie wurden. Fischer Taschenbuch, 12. Auflage, 1998. ISBN 978-3-596-24364-8
- Ernst Klee. Persilscheine und falsche Pässe. Fischer Taschenbuch, 5. Aufl., 1991. ISBN 978-3-596-10956-2
