= Dąbrówczyn =

- Village
- Location within Poland
- Coordinates: 53°11′51″N 17°49′3″E
- Country: Poland
- Voivodeship: Kuyavian-Pomeranian
- County: Bydgoszcz
- Gmina: Sicienko
- Population: 40

Dąbrówczyn [dɔmˈbruft͡ʂɨn] is a village in the administrative district of Gmina Sicienko, within Bydgoszcz County, Kuyavian-Pomeranian Voivodeship, in north-central Poland.
