= Zawada, Bydgoszcz County =

Zawada
- Village
- Location within Poland
- Coordinates: 53°11′9″N 17°47′20″E
- Country: Poland
- Voivodeship: Kuyavian-Pomeranian
- County: Bydgoszcz
- Gmina: Sicienko

Zawada [zaˈvada] is a village in the administrative district of Gmina Sicienko, within Bydgoszcz County, Kuyavian-Pomeranian Voivodeship, in north-central Poland.
