= Szczutki =

- Village
- Location within Poland
- Coordinates: 53°13′N 17°54′E
- Country: Poland
- Voivodeship: Kuyavian-Pomeranian
- County: Bydgoszcz
- Gmina: Sicienko
- Time zone: UTC+1 (CET)
  - Summer (DST): UTC+2 (CEST)
- Vehicle registration: CBY

Szczutki [ˈʂt͡ʂutki] is a village in the administrative district of Gmina Sicienko, within Bydgoszcz County, Kuyavian-Pomeranian Voivodeship, in north-central Poland.

Five Polish citizens were murdered by Nazi Germany in the village during World War II.
