= Vilis Hāzners =

Vilis Arveds Hāzners (1905–1989) was an officer in the Latvian army and Latvian Legion, and a recipient of the Nazi German Ehrenblattspange des Heeres.

== Early life ==
Vilis Hāzners was born in Vircava parish at the Erslaķi homestead into a miller's family. At the outset of World War I, Hāzners' family became refugees in 1915, finding a new home in Valka, however, Hāzners' schooling was interrupted. Following the war, he resumed his studies after his family's return, graduating from the Jelgava Agricultural High School, then working for several years at the Vidsmuiža Livestock Research Station. In 1926 he was called up for compulsory military service in the Latvian army, joining the 3rd Jelgava Infantry Regiment. The military was considered a good career; Hāzners determined to become a professional soldier. He entered the Latvian Military Academy in 1928, graduating in 1931, and was then deployed to join the 7th Sigulda Infantry Regiment stationed in Aluksne. Hāzners was promoted to lieutenant in 1934 on Latvian Independence Day (18 November). In September 1936 he requested and was granted a transfer to the 6th Riga Infantry Regiment. In 1939 he was sent to the highest military academy, graduating in 1940 with a rank of captain. In March 1940, Hāzners was appointed a military training instructor at the Rīga Rainis Gymnasium. On 12 June 1940, he was awarded a Class V Order of Viesturs. He was relieved of military service upon the Soviet occupation of Latvia in 1940.

== World War II ==
After Germany launched its invasion of the Soviet Union on 21 June 1941, the NKVD in Rīga arrested Hāzners on 25 June. The interrogators demanded he identify anti-Soviet elements but Hāzners refused. Hāzners and several other prisoners managed to escape on 30 June as the Soviets began their retreat ahead of the German capture of Rīga the following day.

After a year of brutal Soviet occupation, the arrival of the Germans was initially greeted as a liberation by many Latvians. The Latvian national anthem played on the radio. Hāzners joined partisan forces along the Vidzeme shore ensuring the Russian retreat was complete. Hāzners subsequently performed adjutant duties for Colonel Voldemars Veiss. He became involved in coordinating Latvian military participation in front-line combat on the Eastern Front. In October 1942 Hāzners was appointed county chief of Abrene.

Hāzners resigned his county position in May 1943 and joined the Latvian Legion, 15th Waffen Grenadier Division of the SS (1st Latvian), 32. Regiment as regiment commander adjutant. He was appointed commander of I. Battalion on 6 March 1944 but reassigned as commander of III. Battalion on 13 April. That mid-July the 32. Regiment was forced to retreat from positions in Opochka along the banks of the Velikaya River; the battalion was reorganized as part of the Kārlis Aperāts battle group. On 18 July 1944, battalion commander Lieutenant Colonel Aperāts was mortally wounded in battle near the town of Mozulyu and handed his command over to Hāzners, who with the five dozen or so surviving soldiers and officers he now led managed to cross a swamp and break out from the Russian forces surrounding them. For his heroism, Hāzners was awarded the Ehrenblatt des Heeres (Honour Roll Clasp of the Army).

On 20 August 1944, Hāzners was redeployed to Germany with the remnants of 32. Regiment, where he was promoted to the rank of major and appointed commander of the 15. Fusiliers Battalion. On 26 January 1945, Hāzners was wounded in action at Mrocza (Immenheim) and sent to Denmark for recovery, where he remained until the end of the war.

== Life after World War II ==
Following the war, Hāzners was housed with other Latvian POWs at the Zedelgem prisoner-of-war camp in Belgium, where he was one of the founders of the Daugavas Vanagi welfare organization. Subsequently, he participated in training war invalids, helping approximately 500 take up useful trades and occupations.

Hāzners was active in the exile Latvian-American community. He served as the president of the Latvian National Committee (1948-1951), from 1951 editing the Daugavas Vanagi monthly newsletter, eventually serving as the organization's general-secretary.

In 1977, based on KGB-fabricated documents, Hāzners was accused of active participation in the Holocaust. At the time, he was living in upstate New York, where Fredric U. Dicker, a columnist for the Times Union, revealed his identity. Hāzners was acquitted after neither the Immigration and Naturalization Service nor the Office of Special Investigation (OSI) were able to provide evidence.

Hāzners died 12 May 1989 in the United States. He was buried in Bērzkrogs Cemetery in Latvia.
