= Gmina Sicienko =

Gmina Sicienko Sicienko Commune
- Gmina
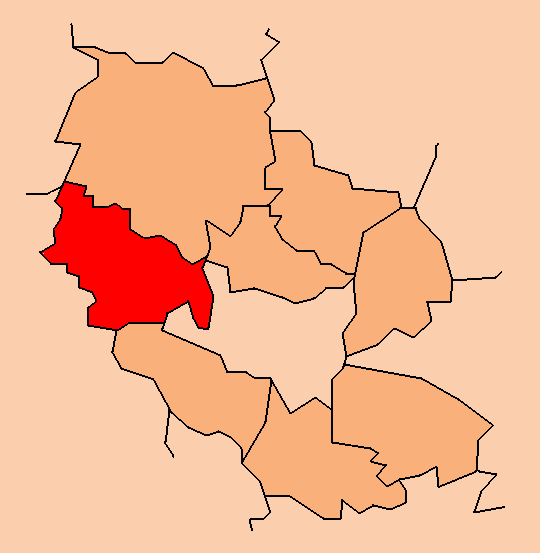
- Location within the county
- Coordinates (Sicienko): 53°12′N 17°48′E
- Country: Poland
- Voivodeship: Kuyavian-Pomeranian
- County: Bydgoszcz County
- Seat: Sicienko

Area
  - Total: 179.46 km^{2} (69.29 sq mi)

Population (2006)
  - Total: 8,987
  - Density: 50.08/km^{2} (129.7/sq mi)
- Website: http://www.sicienko.pl

Gmina Sicienko is a rural gmina (administrative district) in Bydgoszcz County, Kuyavian-Pomeranian Voivodeship, in north-central Poland. Its seat is the village of Sicienko, which lies approximately 17 kilometres (11 mi) north-west of Bydgoszcz.

The gmina covers an area of 179.46 square kilometres (69.3 sq mi), and as of 2006 its total population is 8,987.

== Villages ==
Gmina Sicienko contains the villages and settlements of Chmielewo, Dąbrówczyn, Dąbrówka Nowa, Gliszcz, Goncarzewy, Janin, Kasprowo, Kruszyn, Kruszyniec, Łukowiec, Marynin, Mochełek, Mochle, Murucin, Nowaczkowo, Osowa Góra, Pawłówek, Piotrkówko, Samsieczno, Sicienko, Sitno, Słupowo, Smolary, Strzelewo, Szczutki, Teresin, Trzciniec, Trzemiętówko, Trzemiętowo, Wierzchucice, Wierzchucinek, Wojnowo, Zawada and Zielonczyn.

== Neighbouring gminas ==
Gmina Sicienko is bordered by the city of Bydgoszcz and by the gminas of Białe Błota, Koronowo, Mrocza, Nakło nad Notecią, Osielsko and Sośno.
