= Mochle =

Village in north-central Poland

- Village
- Location within Poland
- Coordinates: 53°12′37″N 17°52′12″E
- Country: Poland
- Voivodeship: Kuyavian-Pomeranian
- County: Bydgoszcz
- Gmina: Sicienko
- Population: 670
- Website: https://mochle.com.pl/

Mochle [ˈmɔxlɛ] is a village in the administrative district of Gmina Sicienko, within Bydgoszcz County, Kuyavian-Pomeranian Voivodeship, in north-central Poland.

Prior to 1999, Mochle was within the Bydgoszcz Voivodeship.
