= Wierzchucice, Kuyavian-Pomeranian Voivodeship =

Wierzchucice
- Village
- Location within Poland
- Coordinates: 53°15′36″N 17°47′08″E
- Country: Poland
- Voivodeship: Kuyavian-Pomeranian
- County: Bydgoszcz
- Gmina: Sicienko

Wierzchucice [vjɛʂxuˈt͡ɕit͡sɛ] is a village in the administrative district of Gmina Sicienko, within Bydgoszcz County, Kuyavian-Pomeranian Voivodeship, in north-central Poland.
