= Trzciniec, Gmina Sicienko =

Trzciniec
- Village
- Location within Poland
- Coordinates: 53°11′20″N 17°48′27″E
- Country: Poland
- Voivodeship: Kuyavian-Pomeranian
- County: Bydgoszcz
- Gmina: Sicienko

Trzciniec [ˈtʂt͡ɕiɲɛt͡s] is a village in the administrative district of Gmina Sicienko, within Bydgoszcz County, Kuyavian-Pomeranian Voivodeship, in north-central Poland.
