= 15th Waffen Grenadier Division of the SS (1st Latvian) =

German infantry division

- 15. Waffen-Grenadier-Division der SS (lettische Nr. 1); 15. SS grenadieru divīzija (latviešu Nr. 1)
- Insignia of 15th Waffen Grenadier Division of the SS (1st Latvian)
- Active: February 1943 – 1945
- Country: Nazi Germany
- Branch: Waffen-SS
- Type: Infantry
- Size: Division
- Part of: VI SS Army Corps (Latvian)
- Engagements: World War II

Insignia
- Armshield of the Latvian legionnaires

The 15th Waffen Grenadier Division of the SS (1st Latvian) (German: 15. Waffen-Grenadier-Division der SS (lettische Nr. 1), Latvian: 15. SS grenadieru divīzija (latviešu Nr. 1)), originally called the Latvian SS-Volunteer Division (German: Lettische SS-Freiwilligen-Division, Latvian: Latviešu SS brīvprātīgo divīzija) was an infantry division of the Waffen-SS during World War II. It was formed in February 1943, and together with its sister unit, the 19th Waffen Grenadier Division of the SS (2nd Latvian) formed the Latvian Legion.

== Background ==
During Operation Barbarossa, German Army Group North occupied the Baltic states. Germany began taking heavier manpower losses throughout 1942. To make up for this, the Waffen-SS was expanded, and on 23 January 1943, Adolf Hitler gave his approval to Reichsführer-SS Heinrich Himmler to form a Latvian Legion. He wanted to make use of the Latvians, who were strongly opposed to Bolshevism.

== World War II ==
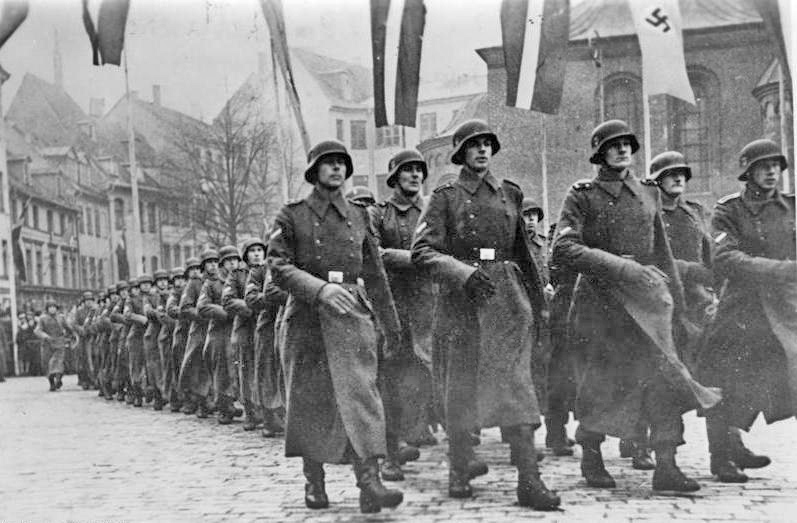
15th SS Division parade through Riga before deployment to Eastern Front. December 1943

After the formation of Latvian Police Battalions in Reichskommissariat Ostland, Heinrich Himmler formed the Latvian SS-Volunteer Legion (Lettische SS-Freiwilligen-Legion) in January 1943. It participated in the siege of Leningrad briefly before being withdrawn from the front again. In February 1943 the legion was expanded as the Latvian SS-Volunteer Division (Lettische SS-Freiwilligen-Division), which later received the numerical designation, becoming the 15th Waffen Grenadier Division of the SS (1st Latvian).

Unlawful conscription of Latvians for military service by the Germans was based on Alfred Rosenberg's compulsory labor decree of 19 December 1941. It was carried out by the Department of Labor of the Latvian Self Administration, commencing in early 1943 with the compulsory recruitment of Latvian citizens born between 1919 and 1924. The 15th Waffen SS, together with the 19th Waffen Grenadier Division of the SS (2nd Latvian) formed the Latvian Legion.

The 15th Waffen SS was swept up in the chaos of the collapse of the Eastern Front and lost much of its manpower fighting in districts surrounding Leningrad (Ostrov, Novosokolniki and Novgorod Oblast). In September 1944 the surviving elements of the division were sent by boat to Danzig. The division fought on the Pomeranian Wall defences and then retreated through Pomerania and Germany to Berlin.

Part of the division, with a total of 824 men under Waffen-Standartenführer Vilis Janums, surrendered on 27 April 1945 to the advancing Americans at Güterglück near the Elbe River. Other elements of the division, amounting to approximately 4,500 men, surrendered to the Americans south of Schwerin on 2 May 1945.

On 22 January 1945, Red Army soldiers killed over 100 unarmed men of the 5th Battalion of the 1st Construction Regiment in the Dąbrówka Nowa Massacre after mistakenly assuming that they were armed.

== In popular culture ==
The Waffen Füsilier Battalion of SS 15 of the 15th Waffen Grenadier Division (1st Latvian) is notably featured as a playable unit in the game Enlisted.

== Commanders ==
- SS-Brigadeführer und Generalmajor Peter Hansen (25 February – 1 May 1943)
- SS-Gruppenführer und Generalmajor Carl Graf von Pückler-Burghauss (1 May 1943 – 17 February 1944)
- SS-Oberführer Nikolaus Heilmann (17 February – 21 July 1944)
- SS-Oberführer Herbert von Obwurzer (21 July 1944 – 26 January 1945)
- SS-Oberführer Adolf Ax (26 January – 15 February 1945)
- SS-Oberführer, later Brigadeführer und Generalmajor Karl Burk (15 February – 2 May 1945)

== Order of battle ==
=== Infantry ===
- 32nd Waffen Grenadier Regiment of the SS (3rd Latvian)
- 33rd Waffen Grenadier Regiment of the SS (4th Latvian)
- 34th Waffen Grenadier Regiment of the SS (5th Latvian)
- 15th SS Füsilier Battalion

=== Artillery ===
- 15th Waffen Artillery Regiment of the SS (2nd Latvian) - first and second formations.
- 15th SS Anti-aircraft Battalion
- 15th SS Panzerjäger Battalion

=== Training units ===
- 15th SS Field Replacement Battalion
- 15th SS Grenadier Training and Reinforcement Battalion (1943; 1944–1945)
- 15th SS Grenadier Training and Reinforcement Brigade (1943–1944)
- 3rd SS Volunteer and Training Regiment (1943; 1944–1945)

=== Construction Regiments ===
- 1st Latvian Construction Regiment
- 2nd Latvian Construction Regiment
- 3rd Latvian Construction Regiment

=== Support units ===
- 15th Waffen Pionier Battalion of the SS
- 15th Waffen Signals Battalion of the SS
- 15th SS Medical Battalion
- 15th SS Nachschub Troop
- 15th SS Field Post Department
- 15th SS Veterinary Company
- 15th SS Wirtschafts Battalion
- 15th SS Waffen Feldgendarmerie Troop
- 15th SS War Reporter Troop

== See also ==
- List of Waffen-SS units
- Ranks and insignia of the Waffen-SS
- Waffen-SS foreign volunteers and conscripts
- Vilis Hāzners
- Dąbrówka Nowa Massacre

== Literature ==
- Bender, Roger James; Taylor, Hugh Page (1971). Uniforms, Organization and History of the Waffen-SS. Vol. 5 (1st ed.). R. James Bender Publishing. ISBN 978-0-912138-25-1.
- Baxter, Ian (2021). SS Foreign Divisions & Volunteers of Lithuania, Latvia and Estonia, 1941–1945. Barnsley: Pen & Sword. ISBN 978-1-39901-298-0.
