= Fredric U. Dicker =

American journalist

Fredric Uberall "Fred" Dicker is a former columnist for the New York Post. He served as the state editor for New York since 1982, where he covered the administrations of Hugh Carey, Mario Cuomo, George Pataki, Eliot Spitzer, David Paterson, and Andrew Cuomo.

Prior to 1982, Dicker was a state government reporter for the Albany Times Union, a morning daily newspaper owned by the Hearst Corporation. He broke the story in November 1976 of alleged Latvian war criminals hiding in the U.S., naming Vilis Hāzners, an upstate New York resident, based on official Latvian publications and Hazners' mention by name to Gertrude Schneider on her visit to Latvia. The information provided eventually proved to be a KGB hit list, per the author, Pauls Ducmanis, of Daugavas Vanagi, Who Are They, and Imants Lešinskis, the KGB operative and "minister" who made the Hazners allegation to Schneider. Dicker subsequently covered the federal deportation trial precipitated against Hazners for the Times Union.

In October 1987, Dicker was physically shoved out of the offices of the New York State Assembly House Operations Committee by Norman Adler, a senior aide to the then Assembly Speaker Mel Miller, creating quite a public stir. A 2005 New York Observer story on Dicker stated that he is a "political institution in his own right" and his reporting "regularly drives news coverage". Dicker broke the Troopergate scandal in July 2007 and engaged in a heated argument with Republican gubernatorial candidate Carl Paladino in October 2010, in which Paladino accused Dicker of authorizing a photographer to take pictures of his daughter.

Dicker retired from the Post in September 2016.

In addition to his newspaper work, Fred Dicker also hosted a talk show from 1997 to 2018 on WGDJ in Albany and WVOX in New Rochelle. He abruptly ended the radio show in November 2018 due to a family illness and his relocation to Florida.
