= Janin, Kuyavian-Pomeranian Voivodeship =

Janin
- Village
- Location within Poland
- Coordinates: 53°10′21″N 17°46′40″E
- Country: Poland
- Voivodeship: Kuyavian-Pomeranian
- County: Bydgoszcz
- Gmina: Sicienko

Janin [ˈjanin] is a village in the administrative district of Gmina Sicienko, within Bydgoszcz County, Kuyavian-Pomeranian Voivodeship, in north-central of Poland.
