= Ulrichsberg gathering =

Austrian German nationalist organisation

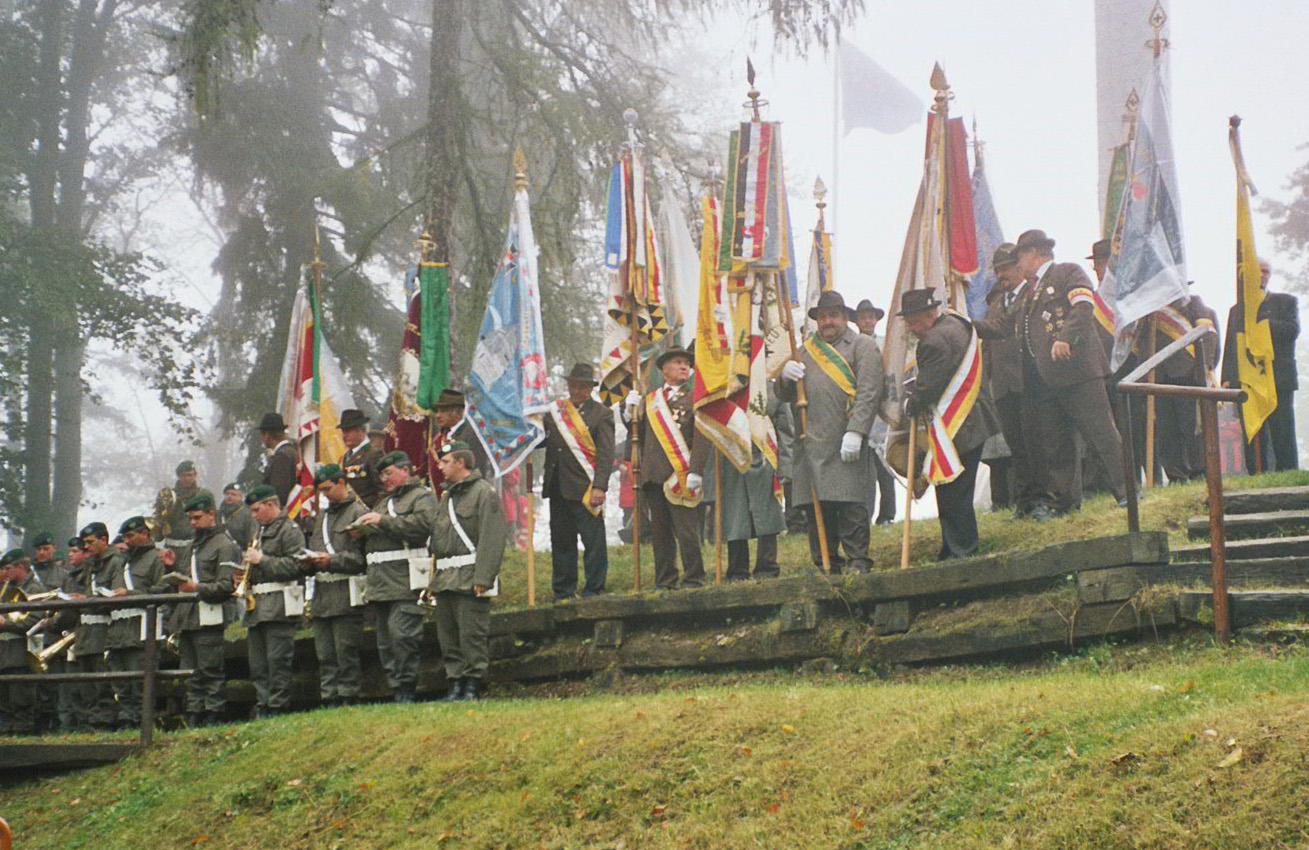
Traditional and Veterans organisations and army musicians at the Ulrichsberg gathering of 2006

The Ulrichsberg gathering (German: Ulrichsberggemeinschaft) is an Austrian German nationalist organisation founded in Klagenfurt in 1953 to memorialise Carinthian soldiers in World War I, the Austro-Slovene conflict in Carinthia, and World War II. Its full name is Ulrichsberggemeinschaft / Heimkehrer- und Europagedenkstätte ("Ulrichsberg gathering / Returning soldiers' and Europe memorial"): this indicates, first, the annual meeting of war veterans and their families which it organises at Ulrichsberg mountain near Klagenfurt; and, second, the war memorials to returning soldiers (Heimkehrer) which it maintains on the Ulrichsberg and in Klagenfurt. The organisation is considered a meeting ground of far-right extremists and unrepentant Nazis, such as former members of the Waffen-SS.

== The organisation ==
The Ulrichsberggemeinschaft ("Ulrichsberg society") was founded on 1 June 1953, and is based in Klagenfurt. Various Klagenfurt politician belonged to the society, including then mayor of Klagenfurt, Leopold Guggenberger (ÖVP), who succeeded acting Landeshauptmann Rudolf Gallob (SPÖ), who had resigned in 2009 because "the clear rules to avoid extremism" had failed.

Ex-minister Herbert Haupt (BZÖ) and Klagenfurt mayor Harald Scheucher (ÖVP) supported the organisation as members. Scheucher's father Blasius Scheucher had served as a Gebirgsjäger and was a founder member of the society. Since 2002, besides membership fees and donations, a significant proportion of the finance of the society has been provided by the Bundesland Kärnten.

Between 2005–12, the society received 115,000 Euros from state funds. Landesrat Wolfgang Waldner reported that this subsidy would be significantly reduced in future, and that if the society were not to distance itself completely from right-wing radicalism, the subsidy would be completely cut.

== Ulrichsberg meeting ==
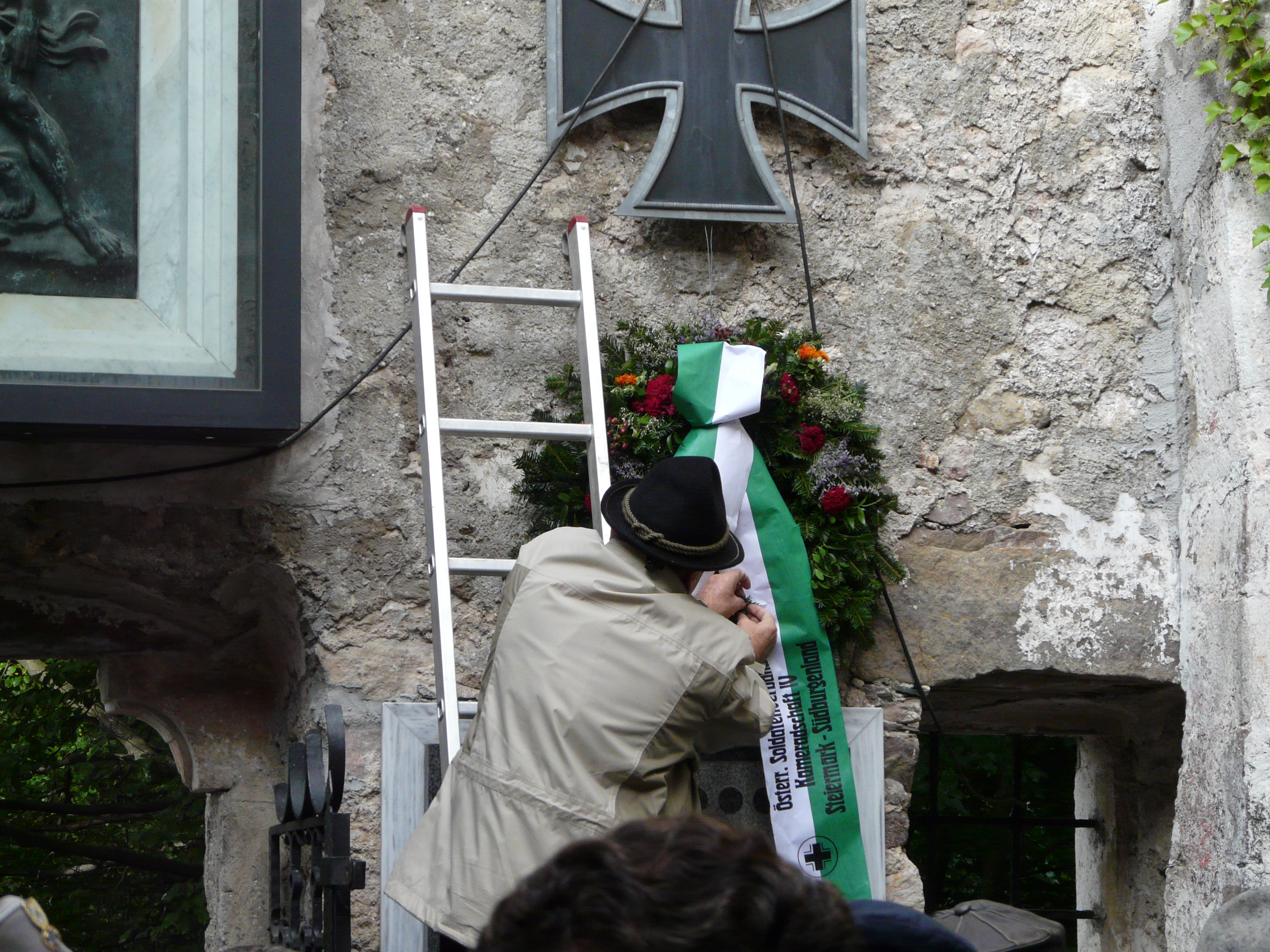
Wreath-laying by the Kameradschaft IV-Landesverband Steiermark - Südburgenland as part of the Ulrichsberg meeting of 2008

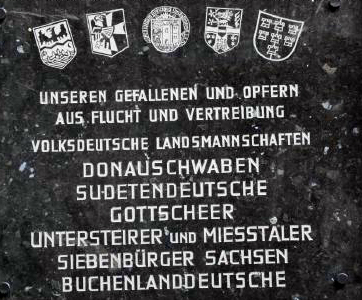
Commemorative plaque for the Heimatvertriebene

Since 1958 there has been a regular memorial on the small meadow next to the cross for the victims of both world wars and of the defence of Kärnten. Right-wing and neo-nazi groups have also been known to frequent this meeting, and it is therefore observed by the Austrian Verfassungsschutz (Federal Office for the Protection of the Constitution and Counterterrorism).

In 2009, the Austrian army under Norbert Darabos ended its logistic support for the meeting. At the same time, the defence minister also forbade the wearing of army uniforms at meetings of the Ulrichsberg society. Darabos distanced himself from the meeting of veterans, because "the Ulrichsberg meetings have always had a right-wing flavour". For these reasons, as well as the political controversy, the 2009 meeting was completely cancelled. BZÖ governor Gerhard Dörfler also distanced himself from the meeting, because it was "politically too far right".

About 400 people took part at the 2010 meeting, which took place at the Herzogstuhl (Duke's Chair). In 2011, the meeting took place at the Klagenfurt concert hall, and the Verfassungschutz reported that about 100 people attended.

In 2012, the meeting returned to the Ulrichsberg. One of the speeches was held by a previous Hitlerjugend and Waffen-SS member Herbert Belschan von Mildenburg, although this had been denied by the organisers beforehand. Instead of the expected crowd of 1000, only about 300 people attended the meeting.

== Political appearances and controversies ==
In 1995, FPÖ governor Jörg Haider notably expressed his thanks to the attending Waffen-SS veterans:

That in these difficult times, where there are still honest people with character and who until today remain true to their convictions despite strong contrary winds. [...] We give money to terrorists, to violent newspapers, to work-shy rabble, and we have no money for respectable people.

— Jörg Haider, 30 September 1995 in Krumpendorf, to Waffen-SS veterans at the Ulrichsberg gathering.

Jörg Haider had a significant influence on the public image of the society with another speech:

[...] it cannot be that bizarre commentaries turn the history of our parents and grandparents into an album of crime, and that their achievements are trampled by history.

— Jörg Haider speaking at the Ulrichsberg meeting of 2000

The meeting as such, as well as the participation of the three largest parties in Kärnten (FPÖ, SPÖ und ÖVP), has recently been strongly criticised.

== Protests against the meeting ==
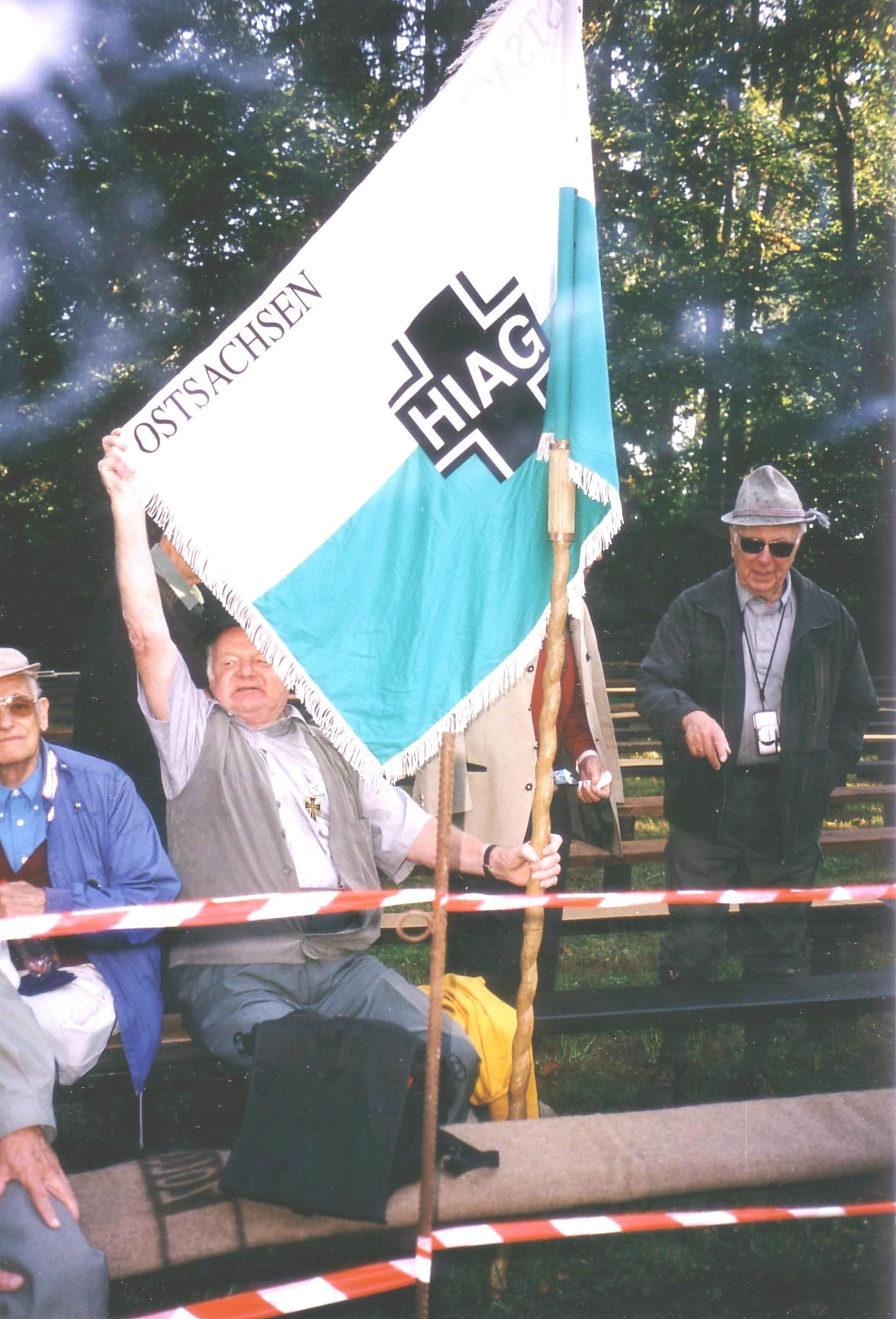
Traditional group "HIAG Ostsachsen" at the Ulrichsberg meeting at Ulrichsberg mountain in 2003

In the night of 17 August 1997, the Ulrichsberg memorial site was defaced and the memorial plaques were destroyed. An Antifa group "kommando z.a.l.a." claimed responsibility for the act.

Recently, various antifascist organisations from the Kärnten scene have manned infopoints and held protest meetings at the time of the Ulrichsberg meetings, to point out the revisionist background of the meetings.

According to the 2009 Verfassunsschutz report, foreign activists, especially from Germany, have taken part in the counter-demonstrations. In 2008, the counter-demonstrations led to blockades, scuffles and property damage. In 2007, a functionary of the Ulrichsberg society and a policeman were injured.
