= Osowa Góra, Kuyavian-Pomeranian Voivodeship =

Osowa Góra
- Village
- Location within Poland
- Coordinates: 53°9′49″N 17°53′57″E
- Country: Poland
- Voivodeship: Kuyavian-Pomeranian
- County: Bydgoszcz
- Gmina: Sicienko

Osowa Góra [ɔˈsɔva ˈɡura] is a village in the administrative district of Gmina Sicienko, within Bydgoszcz County, Kuyavian-Pomeranian Voivodeship, in north-central Poland.
