= Robert Gerwarth =

German historian and author (born 1976)

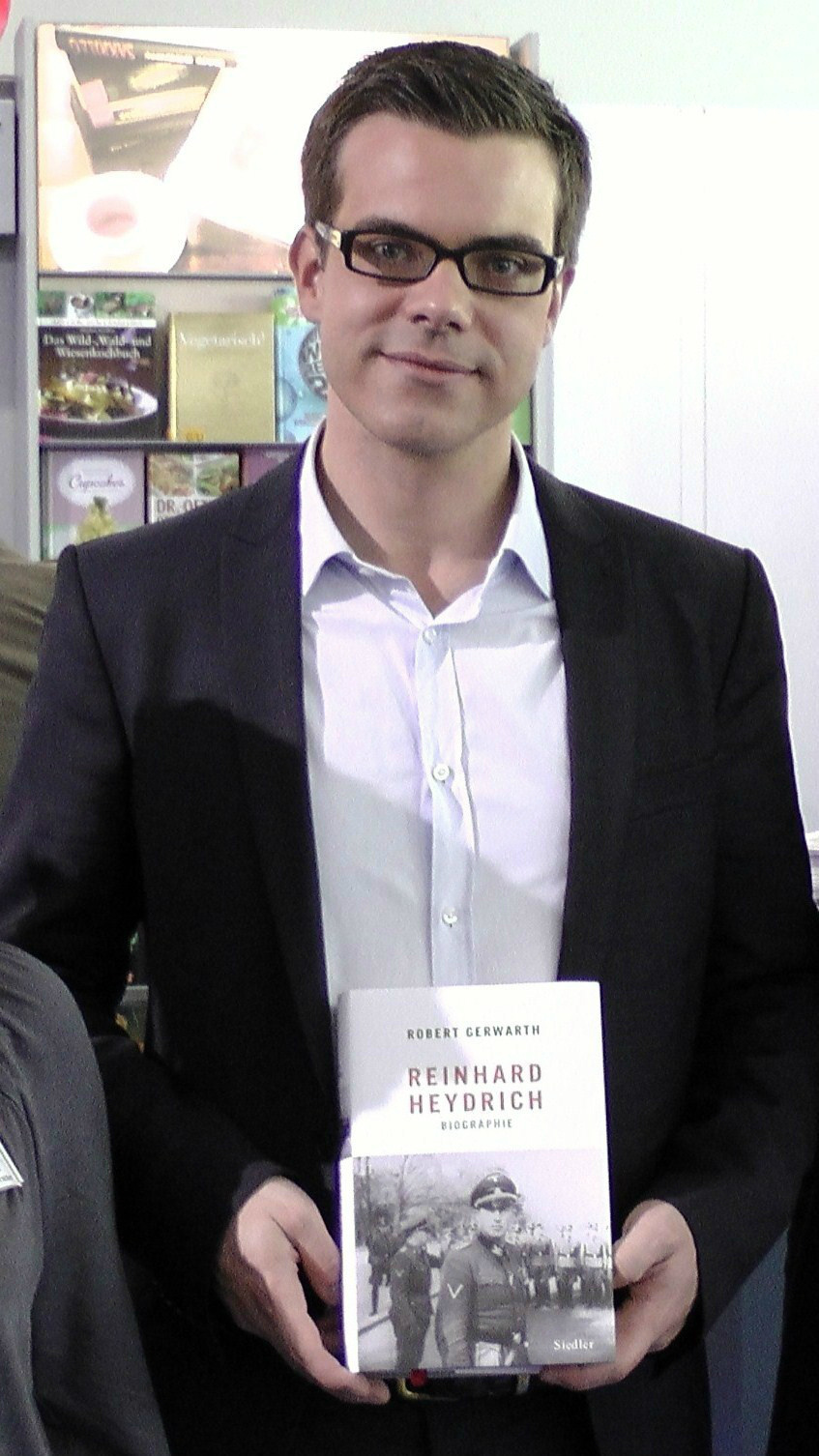
Gerwarth in 2011

Robert Benjamin Gerwarth (born 12 February 1976) is a German historian and author who specialises in European history, with an emphasis on German history. Since finishing a British Academy Postdoctoral Fellowship at the University of Oxford, he has held fellowships at Princeton, Harvard, the NIOD (Amsterdam) and the Institute for Advanced Studies at the University of Western Australia. He teaches at University College Dublin (UCD), Ireland.

== Career ==
Born in Berlin, Gerwarth earned a master's degree in history and politics from Humboldt University of Berlin in 2000. While working on his doctorate at the University of Oxford, Gerwarth was appointed to a two-year lectureship in modern European history. Shortly thereafter, he was awarded a British Academy postdoctoral fellowship. In 2003, Gerwarth received his Doctor of Philosophy from Oxford. Gerwarth is currently Director of the Centre for War Studies at University College Dublin. He is also Head of the School of History, a position that has a three-year duration, his term began in 2017. In 2008, Gerwarth debated Holocaust-denier David Irving on Irish television.

Gerwarth has been commended for the thoroughness of his research on Reinhard Heydrich in his book Hitler's Hangman: The Life of Heydrich. Heydrich did not leave behind a substantive paper trail. Reviews have noted Gerwarth's diligence in digging through archives and other sources in the United States and Ireland in order to uncover the nature of his subject. Gerwarth is credited with dispelling several myths about Heydrich, verifying that Heydrich was not Jewish and that he was a relative latecomer to membership in the Nazi Party.

In 2016, Gerwarth published his third monograph, The Vanquished, to great critical acclaim. The Times Literary Supplement called it a “breathtaking, magisterial panorama” while The New York Review of Books described it as “important and timely”. Originally published by Penguin, the book has also been translated into sixteen further languages.

Gerwarth’s fourth monograph, November 1918: The German Revolution was published by Oxford University Press in 2020. In his review for the Financial Times, Tony Barber wrote: ”Gerwarth's November 1918 [is one] of the most stimulating histories of the interwar period to have been published in recent years."

Gerwarth's other scholarly work has been published widely in international journals such as The Journal of Modern History, Past & Present, Geschichte & Gesellschaft and Vingtième Siècle. He is series editor for the Oxford University Press monograph series, The Greater War, 1912–23, designed to mark the centenary of the First World War and, with Jay Winter, of the Cambridge University Press book series “Studies in the Social and Cultural History of Modern Warfare”.

== Personal ==
Gerwarth was raised during the final years of the Cold War in Berlin, Germany. At age 13, he witnessed the fall of the Berlin Wall. Gerwarth says that living in such a significant historical city sparked his interest in European history. Of his career path, Gerwarth says: "I have no regrets in following this career path; I love being a historian." Other hobbies include skiing, rowing and reading for pleasure. Gerwarth currently lives in Ireland with his wife and two sons.

== Published works ==
- November 1918: The German Revolution. Oxford: Oxford University Press. 2020. ISBN 978-0-199-54647-3.
- The Vanquished: Why the First World War Failed to End, 1917–1923. London: Allen Lane. 2016. ISBN 9781846148118.
- Hitler's Hangman: The Life of Heydrich. New Haven, CT: Yale University Press. 2011. ISBN 978-0-300-11575-8.
- The Bismarck Myth. Oxford: Oxford University Press. 2005. ISBN 978-0-19-928184-8.

== Edited volumes ==
- Empires at War: 1911-1923. Oxford: Oxford University Press. 2014.
- War in Peace: Paramilitary Violence in Europe After the Great War. Oxford: Oxford University Press, 2013 (with John Horne).
- Political Violence in Twentieth-Century Europe. Cambridge: Cambridge University Press. 2011. ISBN 978-0521182041. (with D. Bloxham)
- Twisted Paths: Europe 1914–1945. Oxford: Oxford University Press. 2007. ISBN 978-0199281855.
- Wilhelmine Germany and Edwardian Britain. Oxford: Oxford University Press. 2008. (with D. Geppert)
- Terrorism in Twentieth-Century Europe. London: University Press. 2007. (with H.G. Haupt)
- Constitutions: Civility and Violent Collapse in Europe. Munich: University Press. 2008. (with J. Harris and H. Nehring)
