= Hedwig Potthast =

Private secretary and mistress of Heinrich Himmler

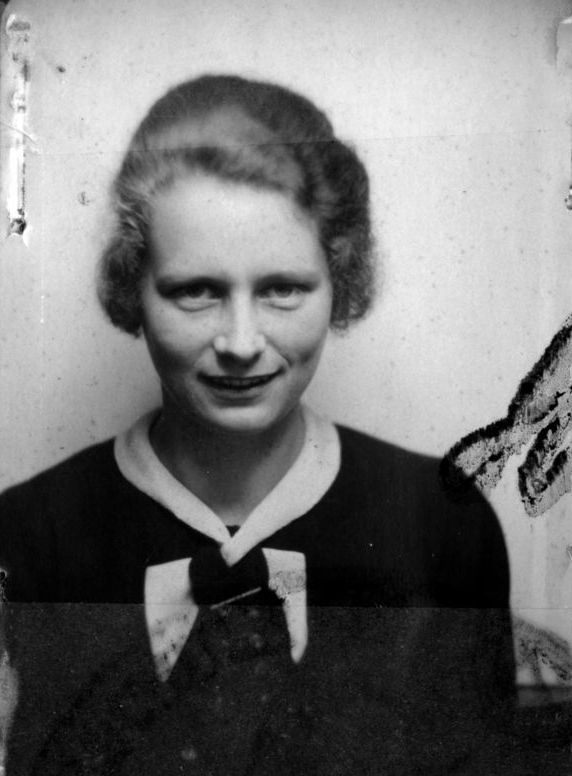
- Potthast in 1933
- Born: 5 February 1912; Cologne, Kingdom of Prussia, German Empire
- Died: 22 September 1994 (aged 82); Baden-Baden, Germany
- Spouse: Hans Staeck
- Partner: Heinrich Himmler (1939–1945)
- Children: Helge; Nanette

Hedwig Staeck (née Potthast; 5 February 1912 – 22 September 1994) was the private secretary and mistress of Reichsführer-SS Heinrich Himmler, with whom she had two children.

Potthast began as Himmler's secretary in 1936 and by 1938 she had become his lover. She resigned from her duties in 1941, and subsequently had two children with Himmler, a boy and a girl. After World War II, Potthast married and lived the rest of her life outside the public eye. In post-war interviews, she refrained from answering questions about Himmler's involvement in war crimes committed by the Nazis or about her own knowledge of them.

== Biography ==
=== Early life ===
Hedwig Potthast was born on 5 February 1912 in Cologne, North Rhine-Westphalia, as the daughter of a local businessman. After her final Abitur exams at secondary school, and attending a finishing school, she trained as a secretary qualified in foreign languages at the Economic Institute for Interpreters, Mannheim. At the end of her training in 1928, Potthast worked in Koblenz.

=== Relationship with Himmler ===
Through Kurt Baron von Schröder, one of the founders of the Freundeskreis der Wirtschaft ("Circle of Friends of the Economy"), she met Reichsführer-SS Heinrich Himmler. In 1934, she was employed at Gestapo headquarters at Prinz-Albrecht-Strasse in Berlin. From early 1936 until early 1941, Potthast was Himmler's private secretary, and in this function was particularly responsible for Himmler's sponsorship and giving of awards.

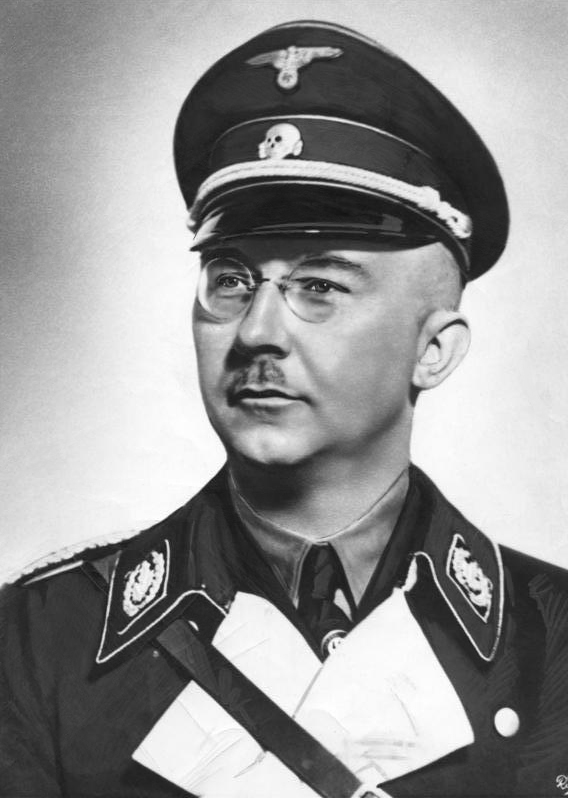
Although married since 1928, SS chief Heinrich Himmler would go on to father two children with Potthast.

Himmler and Potthast confessed their love for each other at Christmas time in 1938. At first they tried to keep it platonic, but they fell into an adulterous relationship. Margarete, Himmler's wife since 1928 and mother of their daughter, found out about Himmler's relationship with Potthast at some time in February 1941. She felt humiliated and bitter, and Potthast's parents rejected the extramarital relationship. Potthast first took up residence in Grunewald and from 1943 she lived in Brückentin, near the estate of Oswald Pohl, because she was a friend of his wife, Eleonore. Lina Heydrich, wife of Himmler's right-hand man Reinhard Heydrich, and Gerda Bormann, spouse of Martin Bormann, were also counted among her friends. Later she lived in Berchtesgaden, Bavaria.

Potthast had two children with Himmler. Helge, a son born 15 February 1942 in the Hohenlychen Sanatorium, and Nanette-Dorothea, a daughter born 20 July 1944 in Berchtesgaden. That same year, Himmler borrowed 80,000 ℛ︁ℳ︁ from the Nazi Party Chancellery and had a house built for Potthast near Berchtesgaden in the small picturesque city of Schönau am Königssee.

Little is known about the overall relationship between Himmler and Potthast. The couple most likely saw each other only infrequently due to Himmler's activity in his numerous offices. It remains unclear how much, if anything, either Potthast or Himmler's wife knew about his "secret work"—i.e., his involvement in the Final Solution, the genocide of the Jews. Potthast's relationship with Himmler ended in early 1945; they met for the last time in mid-March 1945, after which they shared daily telephone calls until 19 April 1945.

=== Post-war ===
When World War II in Europe ended, Potthast was in Achensee, Austria, and, after having learned of the death of Himmler on the radio on 23 May 1945, went into hiding, living temporarily with Eleonore Pohl in Rosenheim, Upper Bavaria. In June/July 1945, she was arrested there by members of the U.S. Army and interrogated for several days in Munich. Margarete and Himmler's daughter, Gudrun Burwitz, did not learn of her half-siblings until after the war. When she tried to make contact with them, Potthast refused. She lived in Theissendorf and kept in contact with the family of Himmler's older brother, Gebhard, as well as Himmler's former close confidant, Karl Wolff, until the 1950s.

=== Final years ===
Potthast later married Hans Staeck and took his name. Her son struggled with ailments throughout his life and stayed with her; her daughter became a physician. In a 1987 interview with former Der Spiegel editor Peter-Ferdinand Koch, Potthast remained silent about Himmler's responsibility for Nazi war crimes. She died on 22 September 1994, aged 82, in Baden-Baden, Baden-Württemberg.

== Sources ==
=== Printed ===
- Himmler, Katrin (2007). The Himmler Brothers. London: Pan Macmillan. ISBN 978-0-330-44814-7.
- Longerich, Peter (2012). Heinrich Himmler: A Life. New York: Oxford University Press. ISBN 978-0-19-959232-6.

=== Online ===
- "Himmler, Heinrich Luitpold". World War II Gravestone.
