= Dąbrówka Nowa, Kuyavian-Pomeranian Voivodeship =

Dąbrówka Nowa
- Village
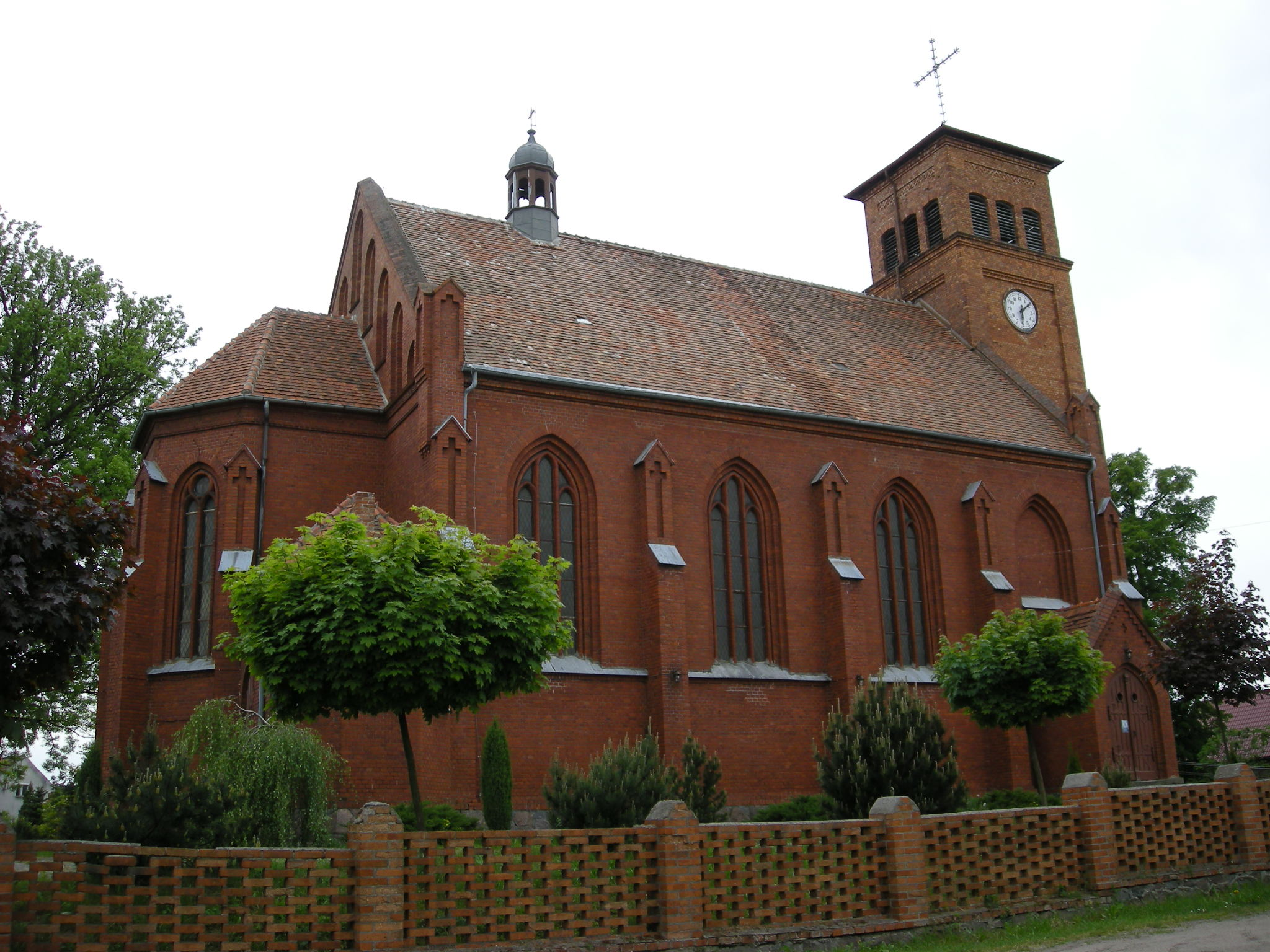
- Saint James the Less church in Dąbrówka Nowa

- Location within Poland
- Coordinates: 53°11′N 17°50′E
- Country: Poland
- Voivodeship: Kuyavian-Pomeranian
- County: Bydgoszcz
- Gmina: Sicienko
- Time zone: UTC+1 (CET)
  - Summer (DST): UTC+2 (CEST)
- Vehicle registration: CBY
- Primary airport: Bydgoszcz Ignacy Jan Paderewski Airport

Dąbrówka Nowa [dɔmˈbrufka ˈnɔva] is a village in the administrative district of Gmina Sicienko, within Bydgoszcz County, Kuyavian-Pomeranian Voivodeship, in north-central Poland.

== History ==
According to the 1921 census, it had a population of 161, entirely Polish by nationality.

During the German occupation (World War II), in 1941, the occupiers carried out expulsions of Poles, who were mostly deported to the Potulice concentration camp, while their houses and farms were handed over to German colonists as part of the Lebensraum policy. In 1945, the village was the site of the Soviet-perpetrated Dąbrówka Nowa Massacre.
