= Samsieczno =

- Village
- Location within Poland
- Coordinates: 53°13′N 17°43′E
- Country: Poland
- Voivodeship: Kuyavian-Pomeranian
- County: Bydgoszcz
- Gmina: Sicienko
- Population: 484

Samsieczno [samˈɕɛt͡ʂnɔ] is a village in the administrative district of Gmina Sicienko, within Bydgoszcz County, Kuyavian-Pomeranian Voivodeship, in north-central Poland.
