= Wojnowo, Bydgoszcz County =

Wojnowo
- Village
- Location within Poland
- Coordinates: 53°12′36″N 17°50′18″E
- Country: Poland
- Voivodeship: Kuyavian-Pomeranian
- County: Bydgoszcz
- Gmina: Sicienko
- Population: 820

Wojnowo [vɔi̯ˈnɔvɔ] is a village in the administrative district of Gmina Sicienko, within Bydgoszcz County, Kuyavian-Pomeranian Voivodeship, in north-central Poland.
