= Korea, Chełmno County =

Settlement in Poland

Korea
- Settlement
- Location within Poland
- Coordinates: 53°12′34″N 18°26′43″E
- Country: Poland
- Voivodeship: Kuyavian-Pomeranian
- County: Chełmno
- Gmina: Unisław
- Village: Grzybno
- Time zone: UTC+1 (CET)
  - Summer (DST): UTC+2 (CEST)
- Postal code: 86-260
- Vehicle registration: CCH
- SIMC: 1028578

Korea [kɔˈrɛa] is a settlement, part of the village of Grzybno in the administrative district of Gmina Unisław, within Chełmno County, Kuyavian-Pomeranian Voivodeship, in north-central Poland.

The Grzybno train station is located near Korea.
