= Zalesie, Chełmno County =

Zalesie
- Village
- Location within Poland
- Coordinates: 53°23′11″N 18°39′15″E
- Country: Poland
- Voivodeship: Kuyavian-Pomeranian
- County: Chełmno
- Gmina: Stolno

Zalesie [zaˈlɛɕɛ] is a village in the administrative district of Gmina Stolno, within Chełmno County, Kuyavian-Pomeranian Voivodeship, in north-central Poland.
