= Robakowo, Kuyavian-Pomeranian Voivodeship =

Robakowo
- Village
- Location within Poland
- Coordinates: 53°21′N 18°40′E
- Country: Poland
- Voivodeship: Kuyavian-Pomeranian
- County: Chełmno
- Gmina: Stolno
- Time zone: UTC+1 (CET)
  - Summer (DST): UTC+2 (CEST)
- Vehicle registration: CCH

Robakowo [rɔbaˈkɔvɔ] is a village in the administrative district of Gmina Stolno, within Chełmno County, Kuyavian-Pomeranian Voivodeship, in north-central Poland. It is located in Chełmno Land within the historic region of Pomerania.

== History ==
Robakowo was a private village of Polish nobility, administratively located in the Chełmno Voivodeship of the Kingdom of Poland. In 1509 it was bought by Paweł Sokołowski from Andrzej Robakowski. In 1868, the village had a population of 184, and in 1885 it had a population of 227.

During the German occupation of Poland (World War II), Robakowo was one of the sites of executions of Poles, carried out by the Germans in 1939 as part of the Intelligenzaktion.
