= Wielkie Czyste =

- Village
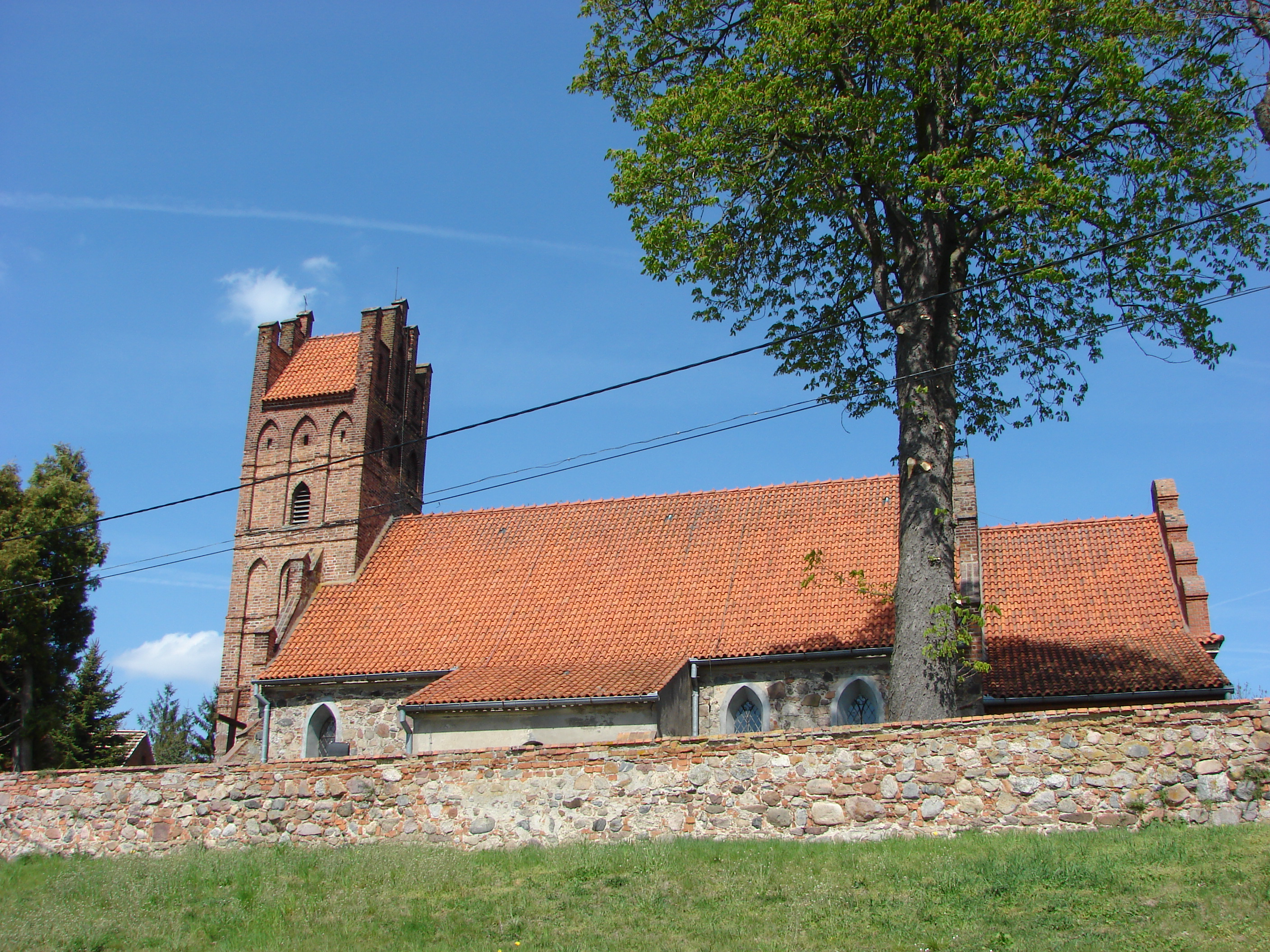
- St. Catherine's Church in Wielkie Czyste

- Location within Poland
- Coordinates: 53°17′33″N 18°29′57″E
- Country: Poland
- Voivodeship: Kuyavian-Pomeranian
- County: Chełmno
- Gmina: Stolno
- Population: 120
- Time zone: UTC+1 (CET)
  - Summer (DST): UTC+2 (CEST)
- Vehicle registration: CCH

Wielkie Czyste [ˈvjɛlkʲɛ ˈt͡ʂɨstɛ] is a village in the administrative district of Gmina Stolno, within Chełmno County, Kuyavian-Pomeranian Voivodeship, in north-central Poland. It is located in the Chełmno Land in the historic region of Pomerania.

The landmark of Wielkie Czyste is the Gothic church of St. Catherine, built in the 13th century.

== History ==
During the German occupation (World War II), local Polish priests were murdered by the Germans in a massacre of Poles committed in 1939 in nearby Klamry as part of the Intelligenzaktion.
