= Kornatowo =

- Village
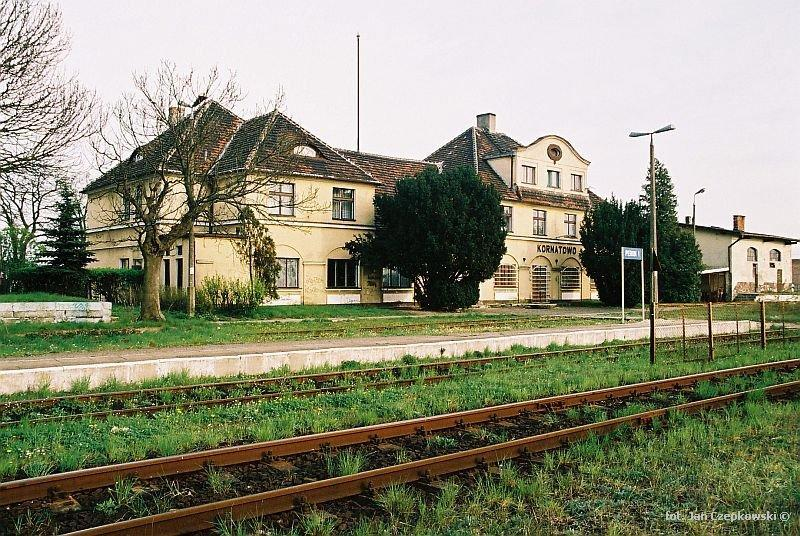
- Train station in Kornatowo

- Location within Poland
- Coordinates: 53°17′N 18°39′E
- Country: Poland
- Voivodeship: Kuyavian-Pomeranian
- County: Chełmno
- Gmina: Lisewo
- Time zone: UTC+1 (CET)
  - Summer (DST): UTC+2 (CEST)
- Vehicle registration: CCH

Kornatowo [kɔrnaˈtɔvɔ] is a village in the administrative district of Gmina Lisewo, within Chełmno County, Kuyavian-Pomeranian Voivodeship, in north-central Poland. It is located in Chełmno Land within the historic region of Pomerania.

The Kornatowskie Lake is located near the village.

== History ==
In the late 19th century, the village had a population of 347 people.

During the German occupation of Poland (World War II), Kornatowo was one of the sites of executions of Poles, carried out by the Germans in 1939 as part of the Intelligenzaktion.
