= Wabcz-Kolonia =

- Village
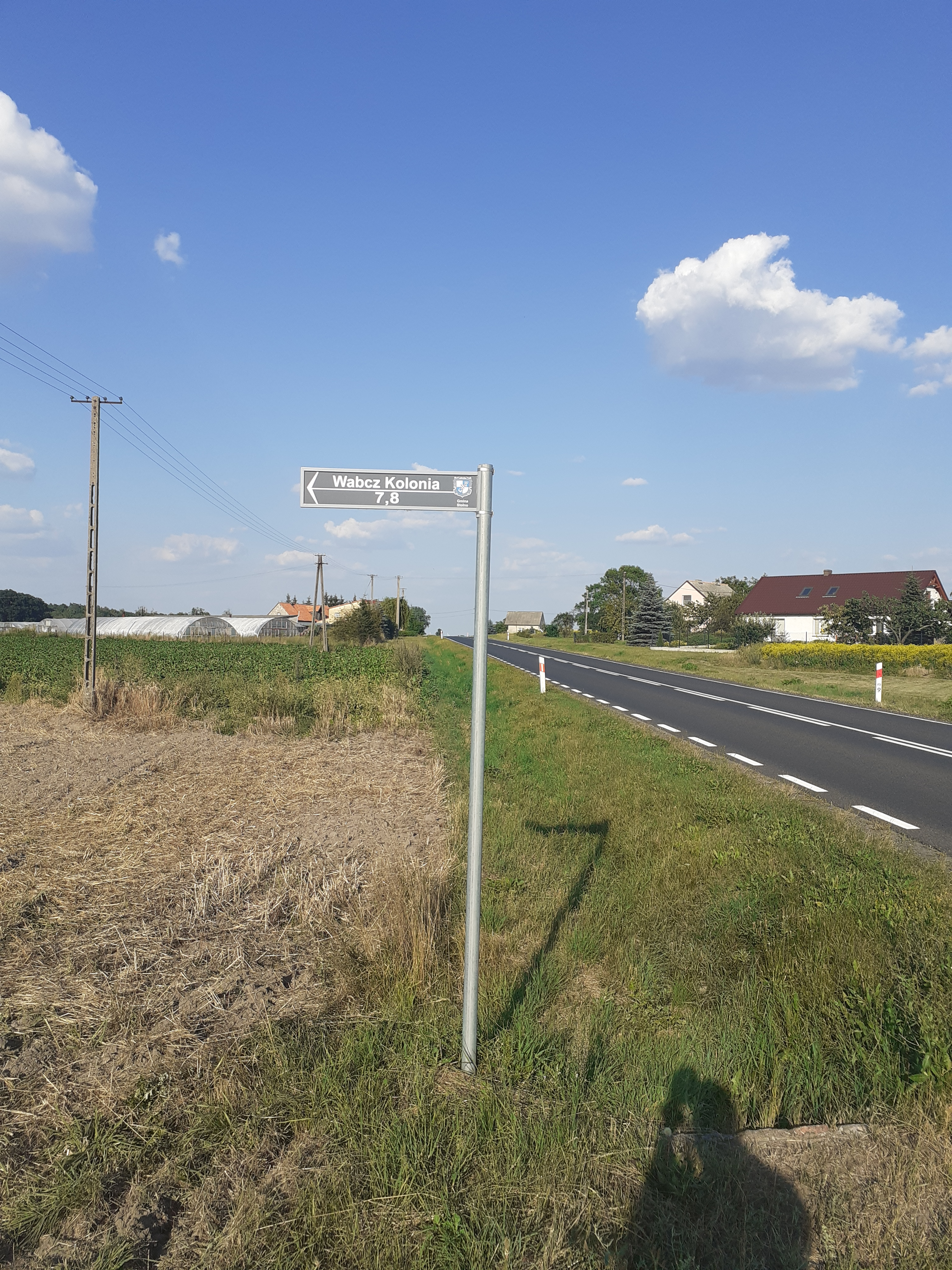

- Location within Poland
- Coordinates: 53°21′8″N 18°34′53″E
- Country: Poland
- Voivodeship: Kuyavian-Pomeranian
- County: Chełmno
- Gmina: Stolno
- Time zone: UTC+1 (CET)
  - Summer (DST): UTC+2 (CEST)
- Vehicle registration: CCH

Wabcz-Kolonia [ˈvapt͡ʂ kɔˈlɔɲa] is a village in the administrative district of Gmina Stolno, within Chełmno County, Kuyavian-Pomeranian Voivodeship, in north-central Poland. It is located in Chełmno Land within the historic region of Pomerania.

== Transport ==
The Polish National road 55 passes through the village.
