= Błachta =

- Village
- Location within Poland
- Coordinates: 53°17′N 18°37′E
- Country: Poland
- Voivodeship: Kuyavian-Pomeranian
- County: Chełmno
- Gmina: Lisewo

Błachta [ˈbwaxta] is a village in the administrative district of Gmina Lisewo, within Chełmno County, Kuyavian-Pomeranian Voivodeship, in north-central Poland.
