= Grzybno, Chełmno County =

Grzybno
- Village
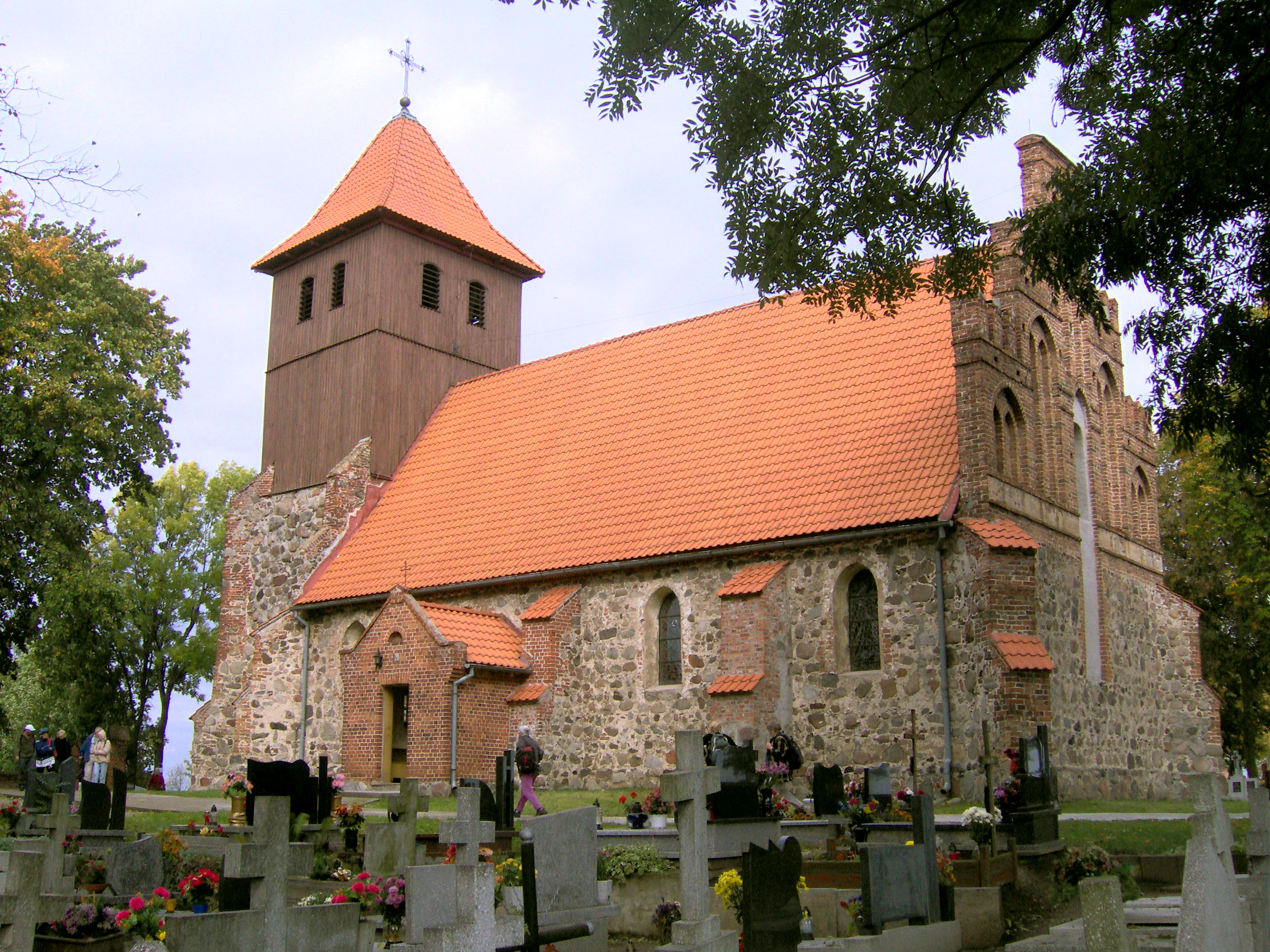
- Saint Michael Archangel church in Grzybno

- Location within Poland
- Coordinates: 53°11′40″N 18°26′31″E
- Country: Poland
- Voivodeship: Kuyavian-Pomeranian
- County: Chełmno
- Gmina: Unisław
- Time zone: UTC+1 (CET)
  - Summer (DST): UTC+2 (CEST)
- Vehicle registration: CCH

Grzybno [ˈɡʐɨbnɔ] is a village in the administrative district of Gmina Unisław, within Chełmno County, Kuyavian-Pomeranian Voivodeship, in north-central Poland.

The local landmark is the medieval Gothic Saint Michael Archangel church.

== History ==
During the German occupation of Poland (World War II), in 1942, the German gendarmerie and Einsatzkompanie Thorn carried out expulsions of Poles, who were placed either in the Potulice concentration camp, in a transit camp in Toruń or in a Germanisation camp in Jabłonowo-Zamek. Houses and farms of expelled Poles were handed over to German colonists as part of the Lebensraum policy.

== Administrative division ==
Several adjacent settlements are considered part of Grzybno: Bobak, Chiny, Garwolin, Korea, Pod Głażewo, Pod Siemion, Pod Unisław.

== Transport ==
There is a train station in the village.
