= Piątkowo =

Piątkowo may refer to the following places:

- Piątkowo, Poznań, a neighbourhood of the city of Poznań
- Piątkowo, Chełmno County in Kuyavian-Pomeranian Voivodeship (north-central Poland)
- Piątkowo, Golub-Dobrzyń County in Kuyavian-Pomeranian Voivodeship (north-central Poland)
- Piątkowo, Pomeranian Voivodeship (north Poland)

== See also ==
- Piątków
- Piątkowski
