= Zakrzewo, Chełmno County =

Zakrzewo
- Village
- Location within Poland
- Coordinates: 53°19′6″N 18°28′21″E
- Country: Poland
- Voivodeship: Kuyavian-Pomeranian
- County: Chełmno
- Gmina: Stolno

Zakrzewo [zaˈkʂɛvɔ] is a village in the administrative district of Gmina Stolno, within Chełmno County, Kuyavian-Pomeranian Voivodeship, in north-central Poland.
