= Grubno =

- Village
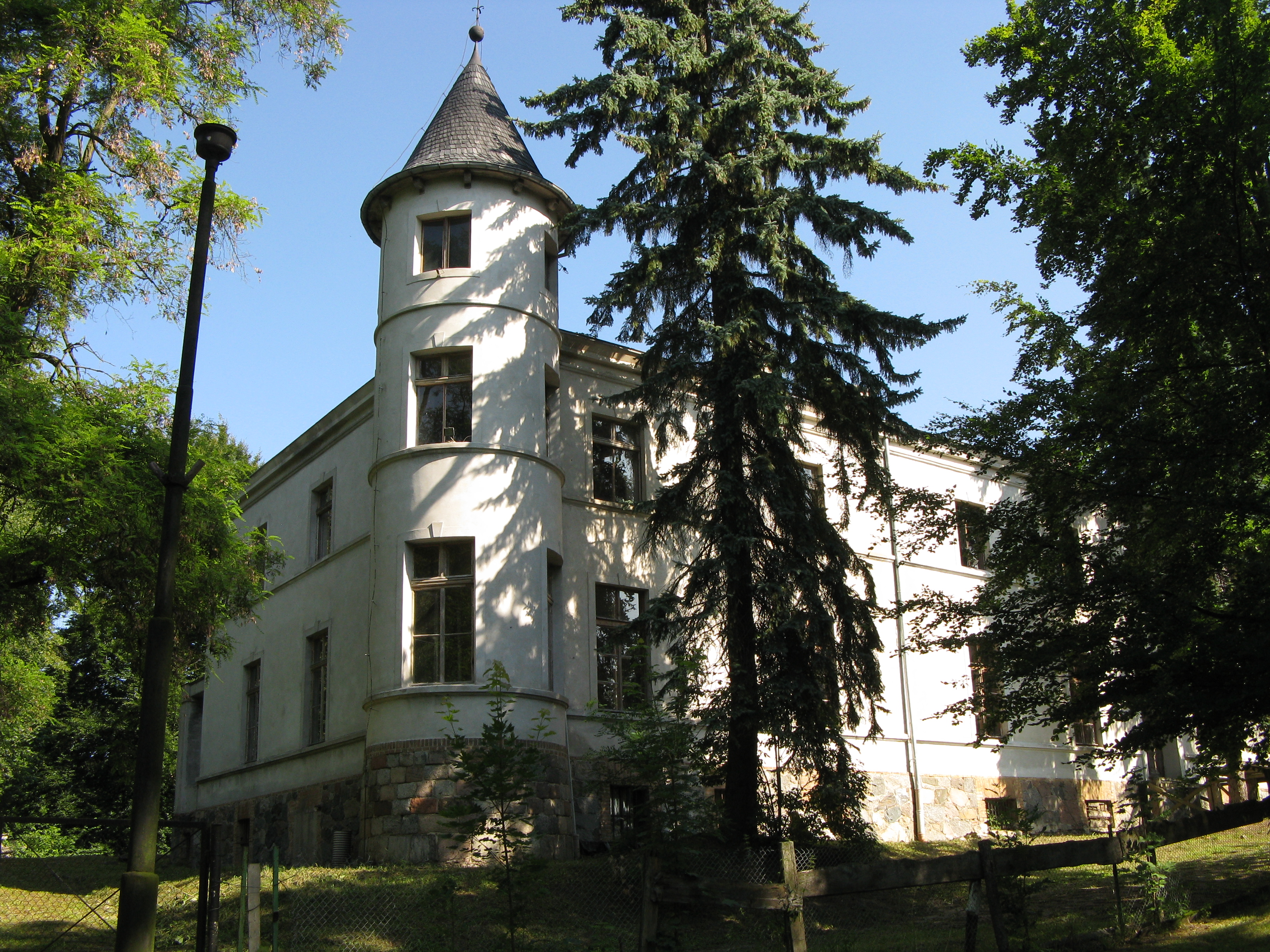
- Palace in Grubno

- Location within Poland
- Coordinates: 53°20′31″N 18°28′12″E
- Country: Poland
- Voivodeship: Kuyavian-Pomeranian
- County: Chełmno
- Gmina: Stolno
- Population: 594
- Time zone: UTC+1 (CET)
  - Summer (DST): UTC+2 (CEST)
- Vehicle registration: CCH

Grubno [ˈɡrubnɔ] is a village in the administrative district of Gmina Stolno, within Chełmno County, Kuyavian-Pomeranian Voivodeship, in north-central Poland. It is located in Chełmno Land within the historic region of Pomerania.

== Transport ==
Grubno is located at the intersection of the Polish National road 91 and the Voivodeship road 550.
