= Wabcz =

- Village
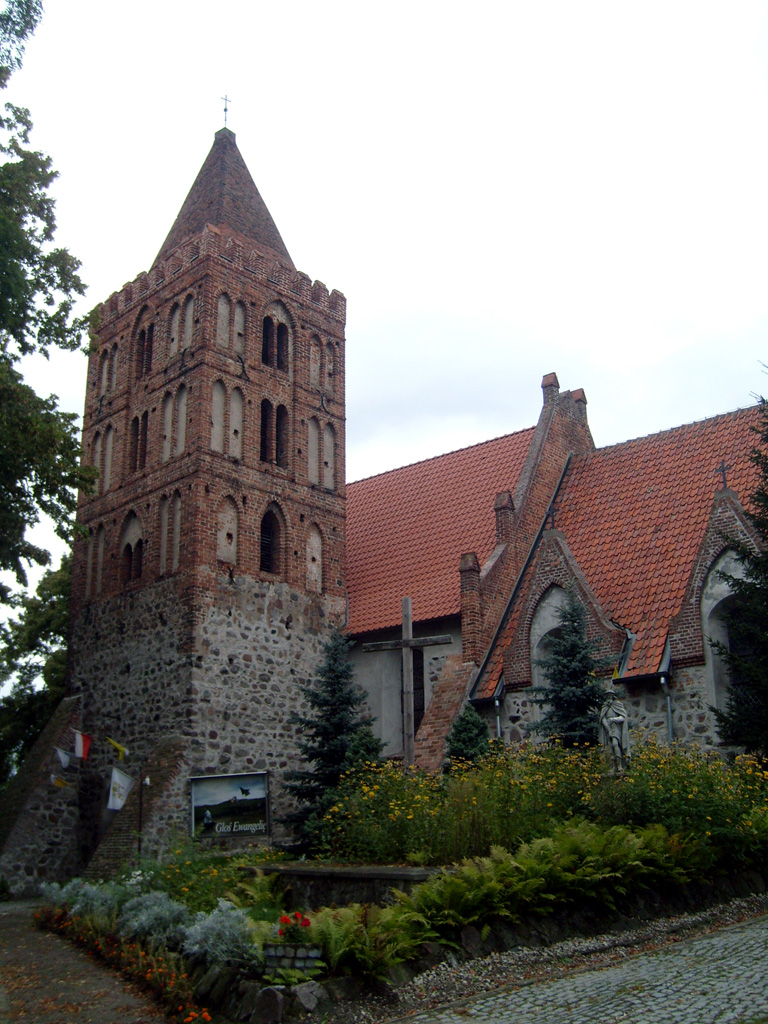
- Saint Bartholomew church in Wabcz

- Location within Poland
- Coordinates: 53°21′N 18°34′E
- Country: Poland
- Voivodeship: Kuyavian-Pomeranian
- County: Chełmno
- Gmina: Stolno
- Population: 660
- Time zone: UTC+1 (CET)
  - Summer (DST): UTC+2 (CEST)
- Vehicle registration: CCH

Wabcz [vapt͡ʂ] is a village in the administrative district of Gmina Stolno, within Chełmno County, Kuyavian-Pomeranian Voivodeship, in north-central Poland. It is located in the Chełmno Land in the historic region of Pomerania.

== History ==
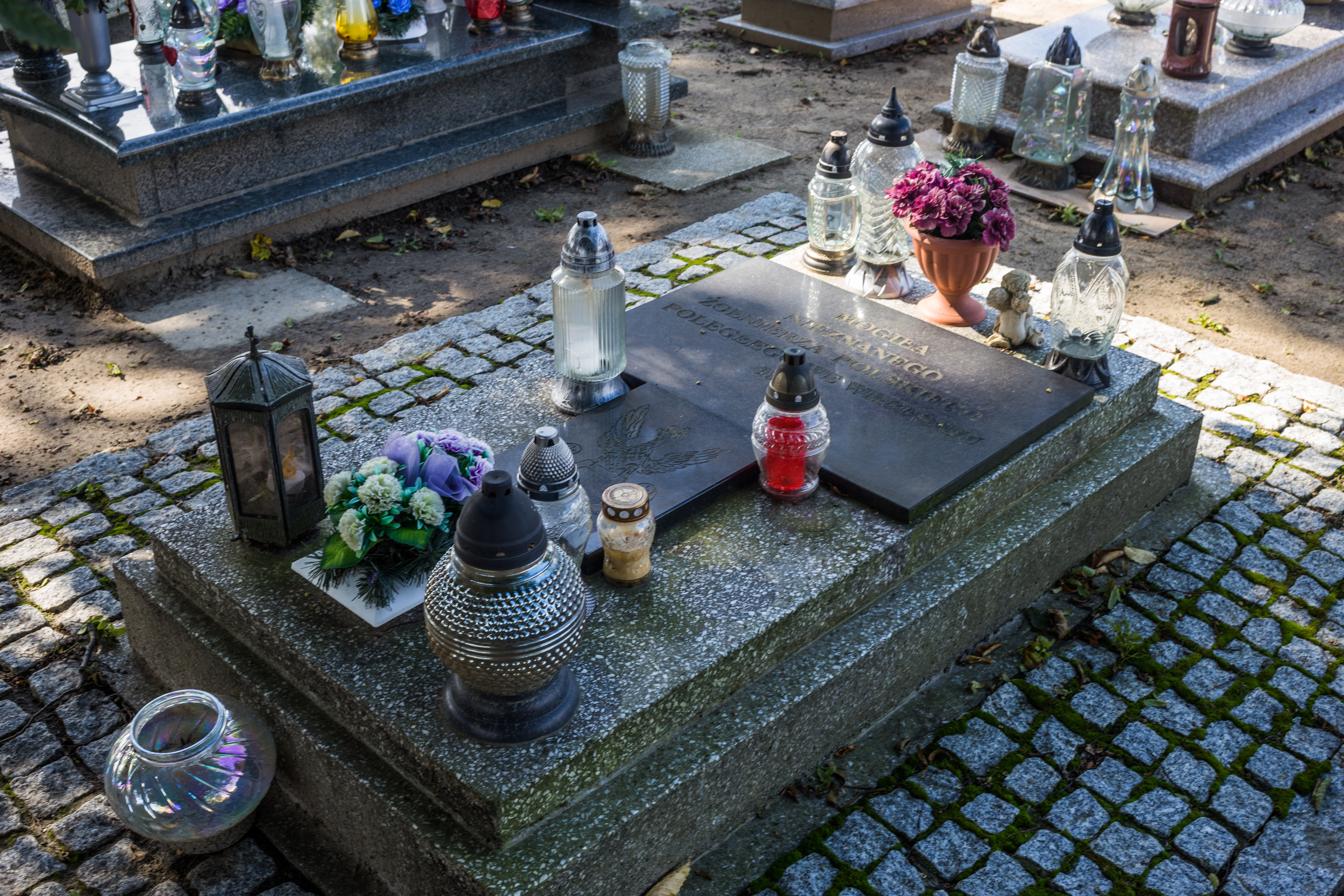
Tomb of the Unknown Soldier from World War II at the local cemetery

During the German occupation (World War II), Wabcz was one of the sites of executions of Poles, carried out by the Germans in 1939 as part of the Intelligenzaktion. Local Polish priests were murdered by the Germans in a massacre of Poles committed in nearby Klamry, also as part of the Intelligenzaktion. In January 1942, the occupiers also carried out expulsions of Poles, whose houses were then handed over to German colonists as part of the Lebensraum policy.

== Sports ==
The local football club is Wojownik Wabcz. It competes in the lower leagues.
