= Linowiec, Kuyavian-Pomeranian Voivodeship =

Linowiec
- Village
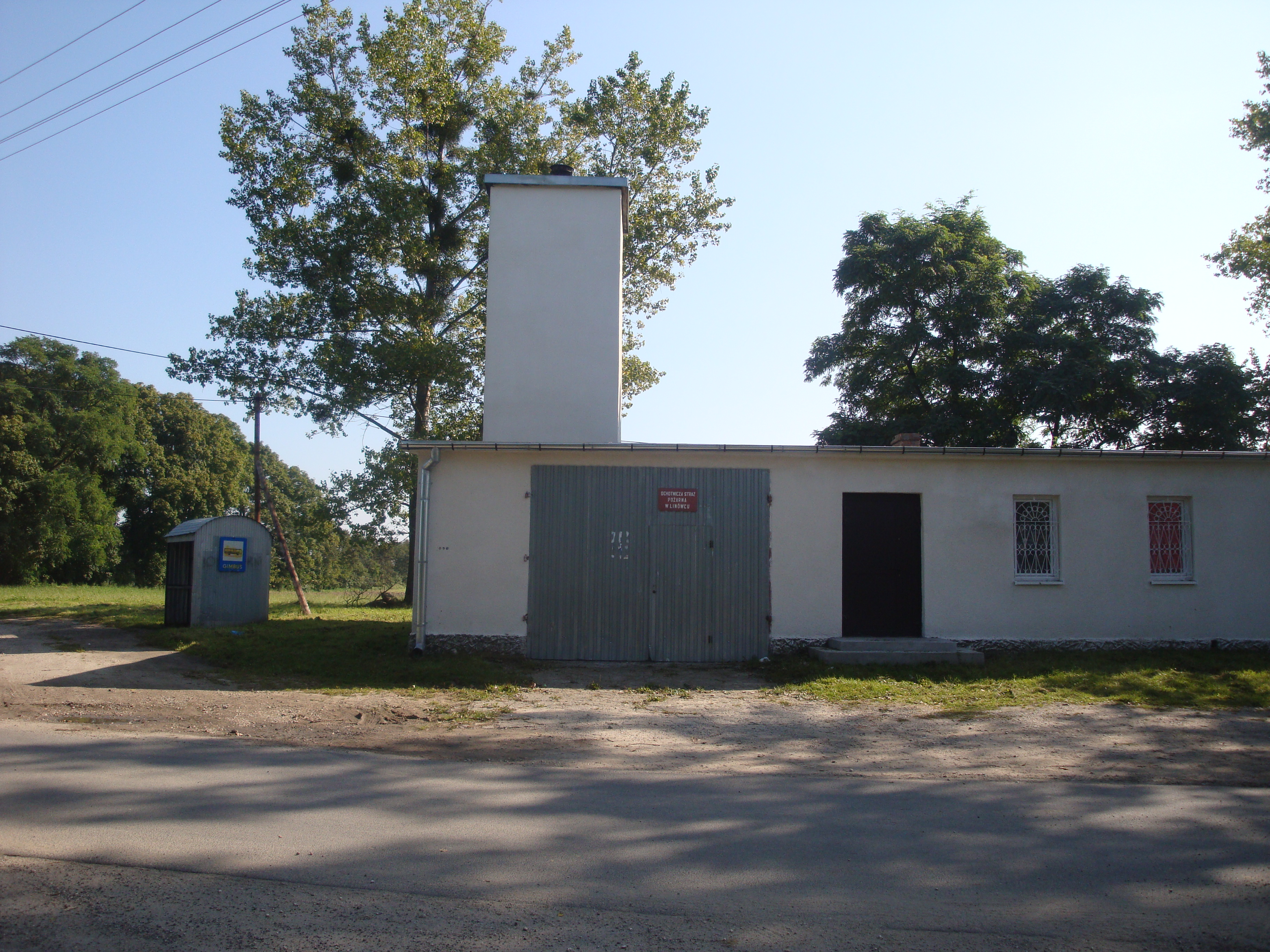
- Voluntary Fire Brigade station

- Location within Poland
- Coordinates: 53°19′39″N 18°36′58″E
- Country: Poland
- Voivodeship: Kuyavian-Pomeranian
- County: Chełmno
- Gmina: Lisewo

Linowiec [liˈnɔvjɛt͡s] is a village in the administrative district of Gmina Lisewo, within Chełmno County, Kuyavian-Pomeranian Voivodeship, in north-central Poland.
