= Henryk Siedlecki =

Polish politician and footballer

Member of the Sejm during the first term
- In office 27 October 1991 – 18 September 1993

Member of the Sejm during the second term
- In office 19 September 1993 – 20 October 1997

Personal details
- Born: 4 October 1943 (age 82) Mgoszcz, Poland
- Died: 7 February 2024 (age 2) Bydgoszcz, Poland
- Party: Polish People's Party (1991-93); Non-attached Member selected by Polish People's Party (1993-97)

Henryk Siedlecki (4 October 1943 – 7 February 2024) was a former Polish politician and footballer. He served as a member of the Sejm during its first and second terms, and as a footballer played for Lechia Gdańsk.

== Biography ==
Henryk Siedlecki
Personal information
- Position: Goalkeeper

Senior career*
Years	Team	Apps	(Gls)
1967	Lechia Gdańsk	1	(0)
- * Club domestic league appearances and goals

Siedlecki was born in Mgoszcz in 1943 going on to study at a school for mechanical engineering. Before his days in Politics, Siedlecki played football and is documented to have spent time with Lechia Gdańsk. He made only one appearance for Lechia, coming on 12 March 1967 against Górnik Wałbrzych in the II liga. He worked as a farmer and eventually turned his attention towards politics. He first stood in the 1991 Polish parliamentary election standing for the Polish People's Party in the Elbląg and Olsztyn electoral district. Siedlecki won his seat and served on the 1st Polish Sejm. During this time his main parliamentary duties were on the "Committee on Spatial, Construction and Housing Policy" and the "Committee on Agriculture and Food Economy". He stood again for the 1993 election, again winning his seat and having the same role as before. He ended up losing his place in the Sejm during the 1997 elections and focused more towards local politics in the Elbląg area.

== Personal life ==
It is stated in his Sejm archived documentation that Siedlecki is married and that he can speak Russian.
