= Głażewo, Kuyavian-Pomeranian Voivodeship =

Głażewo
- Village
- Location within Poland
- Coordinates: 53°12′0″N 18°24′0″E
- Country: Poland
- Voivodeship: Kuyavian-Pomeranian
- County: Chełmno
- Gmina: Unisław
- Population: 125

Głażewo [ɡwaˈʐɛvɔ] is a village in the administrative district of Gmina Unisław, within Chełmno County, Kuyavian-Pomeranian Voivodeship, in north-central Poland.
