= Pilewice =

- Village
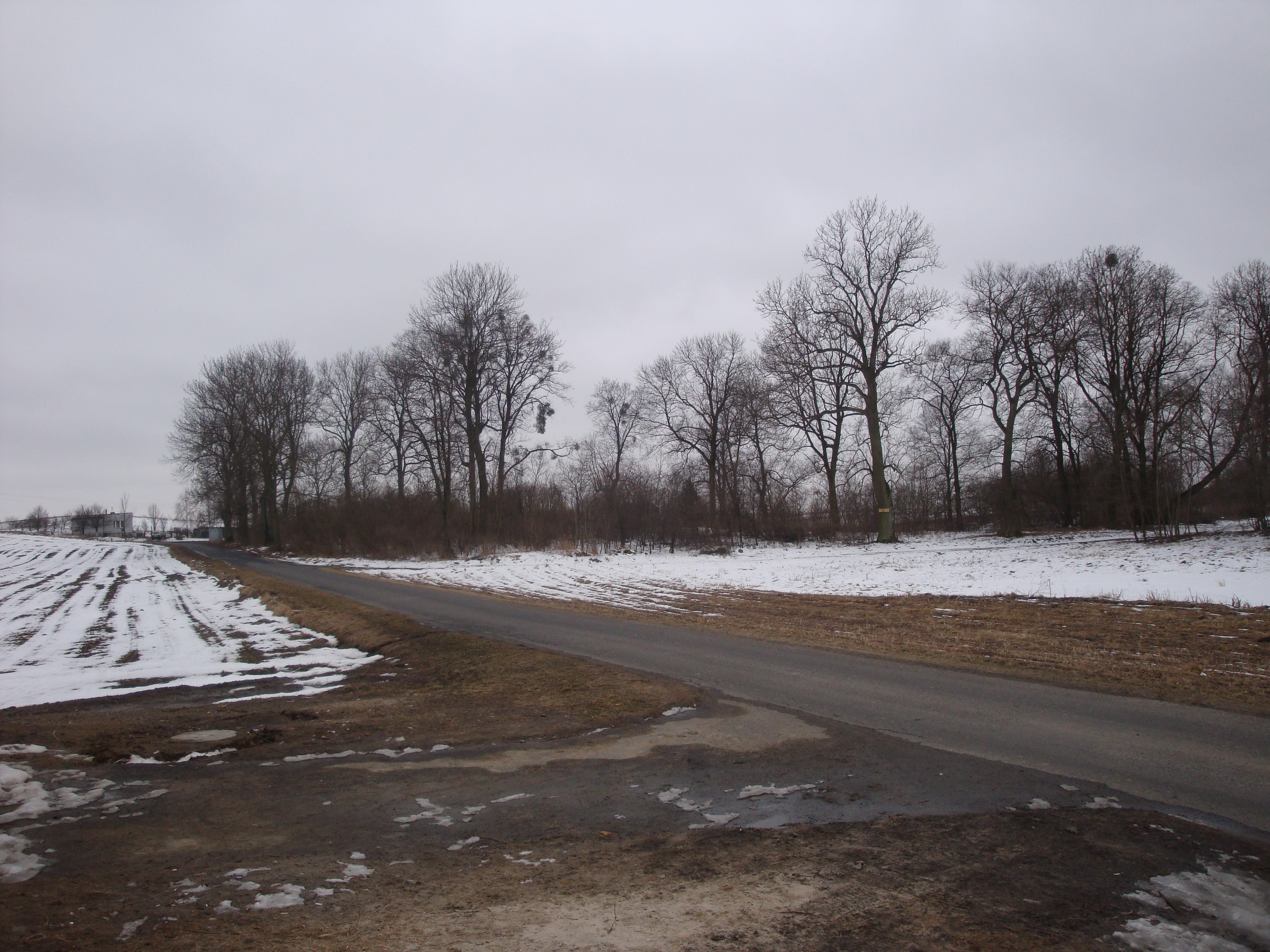
- Former park in the centre of Pilewice

- Location within Poland
- Coordinates: 53°21′37″N 18°42′54″E
- Country: Poland
- Voivodeship: Kuyavian-Pomeranian
- County: Chełmno
- Gmina: Stolno
- Time zone: UTC+1 (CET)
  - Summer (DST): UTC+2 (CEST)
- Vehicle registration: CCH

Pilewice [pilɛˈvit͡sɛ] is a village in the administrative district of Gmina Stolno, within Chełmno County, Kuyavian-Pomeranian Voivodeship, in north-central Poland. It is located in Chełmno Land within the historic region of Pomerania.

== Transport ==
The A1 motorway runs nearby, west of the village.
