= Lisewo =

- Village
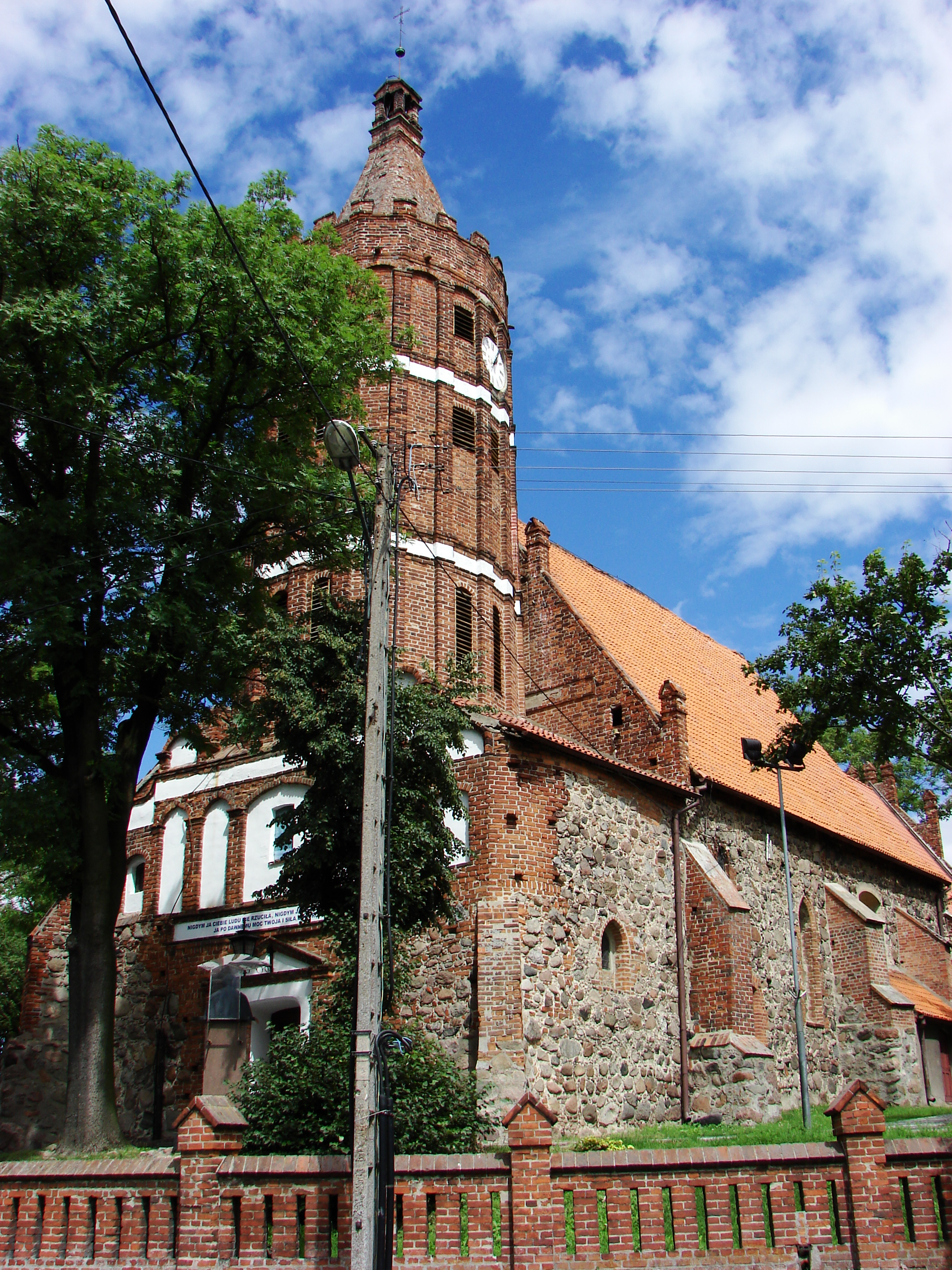
- Church of The Holy Cross. Late thirteenth century.

- Location within Poland
- Coordinates: 53°17′38″N 18°41′19″E
- Country: Poland
- Voivodeship: Kuyavian-Pomeranian
- County: Chełmno
- Gmina: Lisewo
- First mentioned: 1293
- Population: 1,700
- Time zone: UTC+1 (CET)
  - Summer (DST): UTC+2 (CEST)
- Vehicle registration: CCH
- Website: http://www.lisewo.com

Lisewo [liˈsɛvɔ] is a village in the Kuyavian-Pomeranian Voivodeship in north-central Poland. The village is the seat of Gmina Lisewo, a part of Chełmno County.

== History ==
The oldest known mention of the village comes from 1293.

During the German occupation (World War II), Lisewo was one of the sites of executions of Poles, carried out by the Germans in 1939 as part of the Intelligenzaktion. Local Polish teachers were murdered by the Germans in a massacre of Poles committed in nearby Klamry, also as part of the Intelligenzaktion.

== The village and the municipality ==
From an administrative point of view, Lisewo is a community.

After World War II in February 1945, the voivodship of Pomorskie was restored. Its seat was first of all situated in Toruń and then in April moved to Bydgoszcz. At the same time the district of Chełmno was segregated into new divisions and communities.

This state was kept until 1954, when further districts were divided into smaller units. Krusin and Lisewo both were counted to these small units. The next territorial-administrative reform of the voivodship of Bydgoszcz occurred in 1973. Communities were reintroduced and rural units deleted. Lisewo regained its status of a community. In 1975, the Toruń Voivodeship was founded, and Lisewo was one of the 49 municipalities belonging to it.

The village itself occurs in the oldest known documents under the name of Lissow in 1293, Lissaw/Lysaw in 1408 and Leysaw, Leissan, Lysow, Lissowo in 1530.

== Sports ==
The local football club is Victoria Lisewo. It competes in the lower leagues.

== Transport ==
The north–south A1 motorway (Gdańsk-Cieszyn) passes east of the village and one of its exits is located there.

== Notable residents ==
- Georg Jauer (1896–1971), general
