= Błoto, Kuyavian-Pomeranian Voivodeship =

Błoto
- Village
- Location within Poland
- Coordinates: 53°15′N 18°21′E
- Country: Poland
- Voivodeship: Kuyavian-Pomeranian
- County: Chełmno
- Gmina: Unisław
- Population (approx.): 200

Błoto [ˈbwɔtɔ] is a village in the administrative district of Gmina Unisław, within Chełmno County, Kuyavian-Pomeranian Voivodeship, in north-central Poland. The village has an approximate population of 200.
