= Nałęcz =

Nałęcz may refer to:

- Nałęcz, Kuyavian-Pomeranian Voivodeship, a village in north-central Poland
- Tomasz Nałęcz, Polish politician and academic
- Nałęcz coat-of-arms
