= Rybieniec, Kuyavian-Pomeranian Voivodeship =

Rybieniec
- Village
- Location within Poland
- Coordinates: 53°20′N 18°30′E
- Country: Poland
- Voivodeship: Kuyavian-Pomeranian
- County: Chełmno
- Gmina: Stolno

Rybieniec [rɨˈbjɛɲɛt͡s] is a village in the administrative district of Gmina Stolno, within Chełmno County, Kuyavian-Pomeranian Voivodeship, in north-central Poland.
