= Raciniewo, Kuyavian-Pomeranian Voivodeship =

Raciniewo
- Village
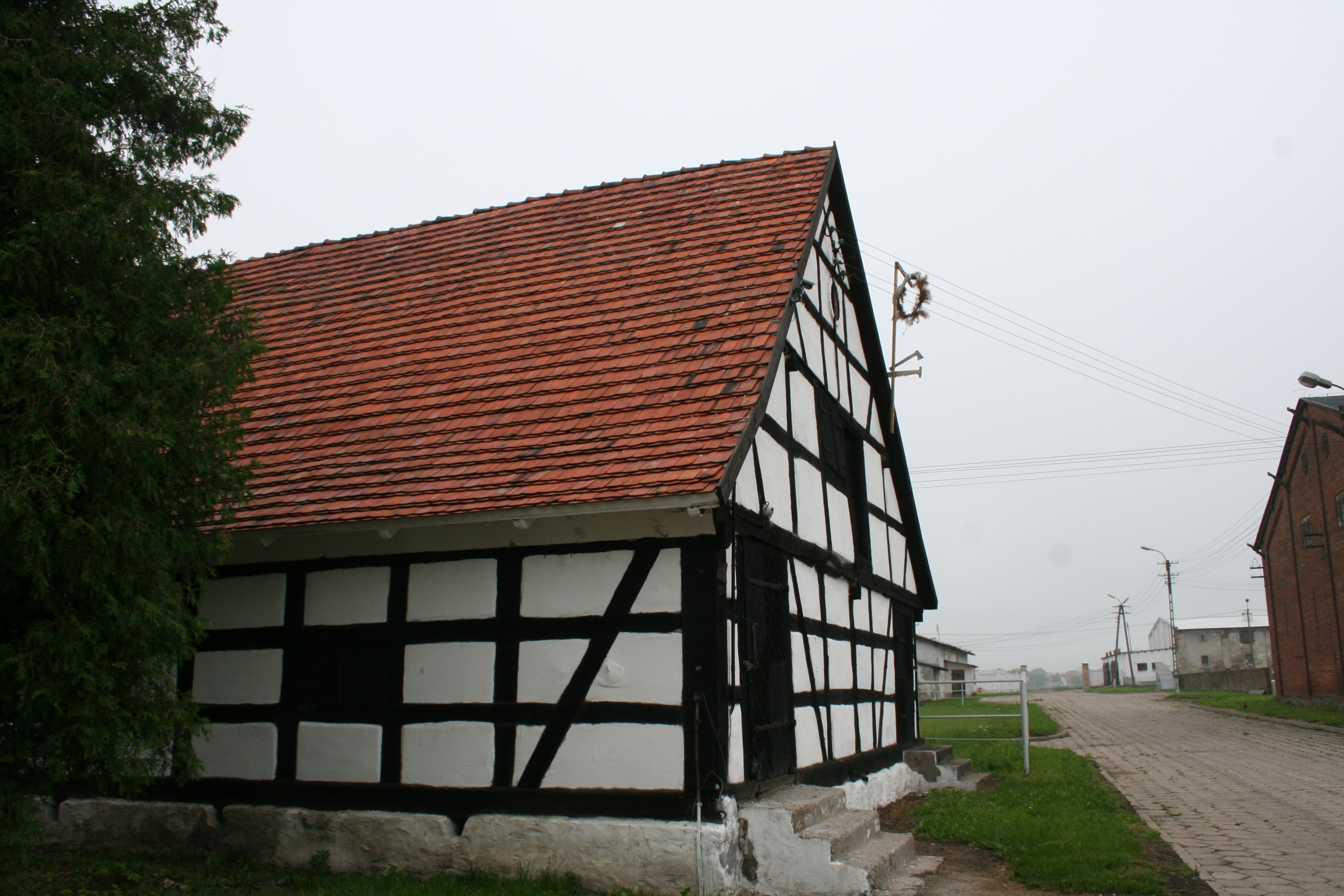
- Historic timber framed granary in Raciniewo

- Location within Poland
- Coordinates: 53°11′57″N 18°22′21″E
- Country: Poland
- Voivodeship: Kuyavian-Pomeranian
- County: Chełmno
- Gmina: Unisław
- Time zone: UTC+1 (CET)
  - Summer (DST): UTC+2 (CEST)
- Vehicle registration: CCH

Raciniewo [rat͡ɕiˈɲɛvɔ] is a village in the administrative district of Gmina Unisław, within Chełmno County, Kuyavian-Pomeranian Voivodeship, in north-central Poland. It is located in Chełmno Land within the historic region of Pomerania.

During the German occupation of Poland (World War II), Raciniewo was one of the sites of executions of Poles, carried out by the Germans in 1939 as part of the Intelligenzaktion.

In 2006, Paweł Jumper, a popular Polish YouTube video and Internet meme, was shot in the village, attracting visitors from various parts of Poland.
