= Bruki Unisławskie =

- Village
- Location within Poland
- Coordinates: 53°13′11″N 18°20′1″E
- Country: Poland
- Voivodeship: Kuyavian-Pomeranian
- County: Chełmno
- Gmina: Unisław
- Website: www.gmina-unislaw.pl

Bruki Unisławskie [ˈbruki uniˈswafskʲɛ] is a village in the administrative district of Gmina Unisław, within Chełmno County, Kuyavian-Pomeranian Voivodeship, in north-central Poland.
