= Wierzbowo, Kuyavian-Pomeranian Voivodeship =

Wierzbowo
- Village
- Location within Poland
- Coordinates: 53°19′13″N 18°35′19″E
- Country: Poland
- Voivodeship: Kuyavian-Pomeranian
- County: Chełmno
- Gmina: Lisewo

Wierzbowo [vjɛʐˈbɔvɔ] is a village in the administrative district of Gmina Lisewo, within Chełmno County, Kuyavian-Pomeranian Voivodeship, in north-central Poland.
