= Tytlewo =

- Village
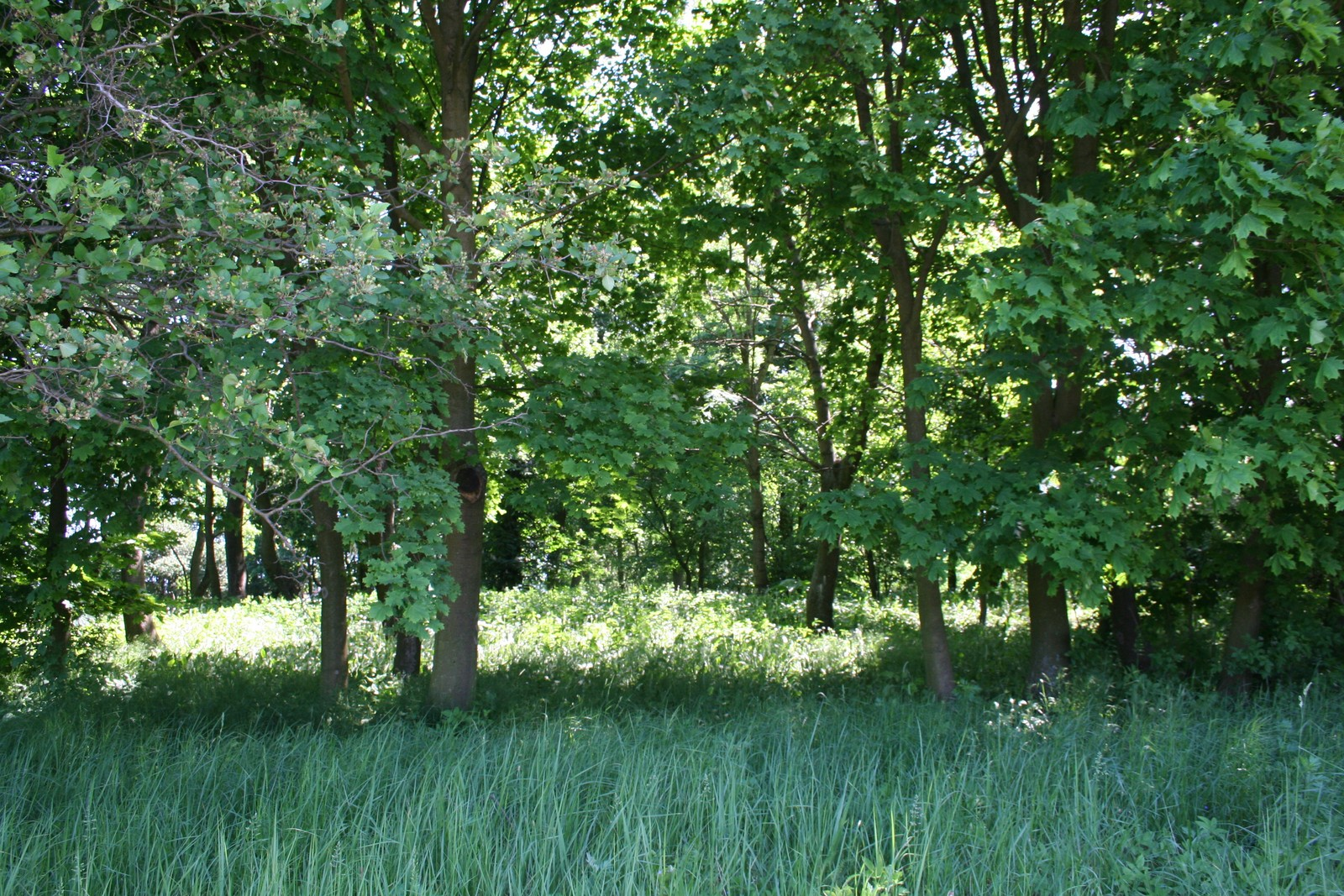
- Trees at a manor park in Tytlewo

- Location within Poland
- Coordinates: 53°17′54″N 18°34′21″E
- Country: Poland
- Voivodeship: Kuyavian-Pomeranian
- County: Chełmno
- Gmina: Lisewo

Tytlewo [tɨtˈlɛvɔ] is a village in the administrative district of Gmina Lisewo, within Chełmno County, Kuyavian-Pomeranian Voivodeship, in north-central Poland.
