= Sarnowo, Chełmno County =

Sarnowo
- Village
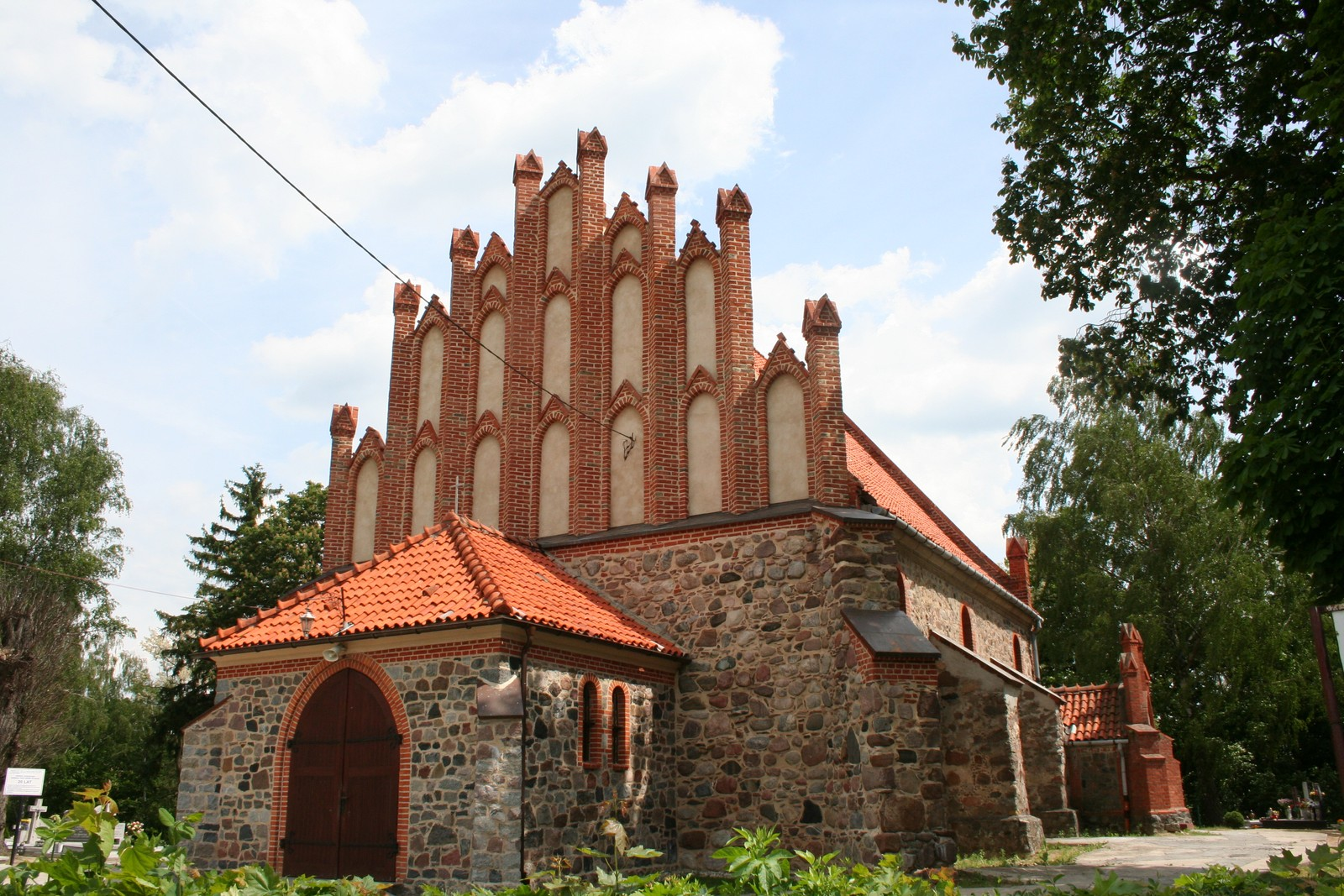
- Gothic Saint Martin church in Sarnowo

- Location within Poland
- Coordinates: 53°22′N 18°42′E
- Country: Poland
- Voivodeship: Kuyavian-Pomeranian
- County: Chełmno
- Gmina: Stolno
- Time zone: UTC+1 (CET)
  - Summer (DST): UTC+2 (CEST)
- Vehicle registration: CCH

Sarnowo [sarˈnɔvɔ] is a village in the administrative district of Gmina Stolno, within Chełmno County, Kuyavian-Pomeranian Voivodeship, in north-central Poland. It is located in the Chełmno Land in the historic region of Pomerania.

== History ==
During the German occupation (World War II), Sarnowo was one of the sites of executions of Poles, carried out by the Germans in 1939 as part of the Intelligenzaktion. Local Polish priests were murdered by the Germans in a massacre of Poles committed in nearby Klamry, also as part of the Intelligenzaktion.
