= Klęczkowo =

Klęczkowo may refer to the following places in Poland:

- Klęczkowo, Kuyavian-Pomeranian Voivodeship
- Klęczkowo, Warmian-Masurian Voivodeship

== See also ==
- Kleczkowo, Masovian Voivodeship
