= Kokocko =

- Village
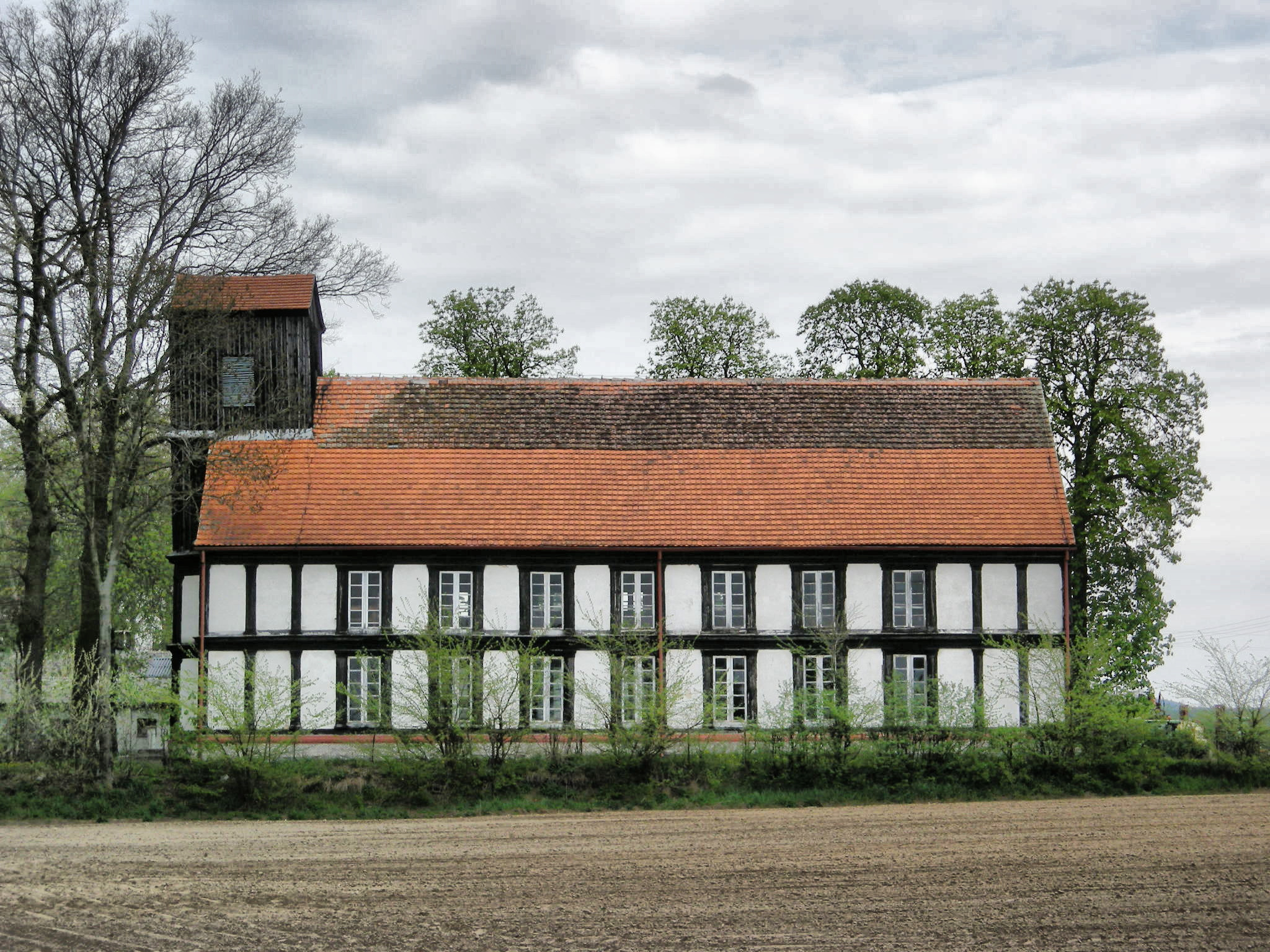
- Church of the Immaculate Heart of Mary

- Location within Poland
- Coordinates: 53°15′54″N 18°19′25″E
- Country: Poland
- Voivodeship: Kuyavian-Pomeranian
- County: Chełmno
- Gmina: Unisław

Population
  - Total: 470
- Time zone: UTC+1 (CET)
  - Summer (DST): UTC+2 (CEST)
- Vehicle registration: CCH

Kokocko [kɔˈkɔt͡skɔ] is a village in the administrative district of Gmina Unisław, within Chełmno County, Kuyavian-Pomeranian Voivodeship, in north-central Poland.

Kokocko was a private church village, administratively located in the Chełmno Voivodeship of the Kingdom of Poland.
