= Paparzyn =

- Village
- Location within Poland
- Coordinates: 53°21′46″N 18°37′37″E
- Country: Poland
- Voivodeship: Kuyavian-Pomeranian
- County: Chełmno
- Gmina: Stolno
- Time zone: UTC+1 (CET)
  - Summer (DST): UTC+2 (CEST)
- Vehicle registration: CCH

Paparzyn [paˈpaʐɨn] is a village in the administrative district of Gmina Stolno, within Chełmno County, Kuyavian-Pomeranian Voivodeship, in north-central Poland. It is located in Chełmno Land within the historic region of Pomerania.

During the German occupation of Poland (World War II), Paparzyn was one of the sites of executions of Poles, carried out by the Germans in 1939 as part of the Intelligenzaktion.
