= Gorzuchowo, Kuyavian-Pomeranian Voivodeship =

Gorzuchowo
- Village
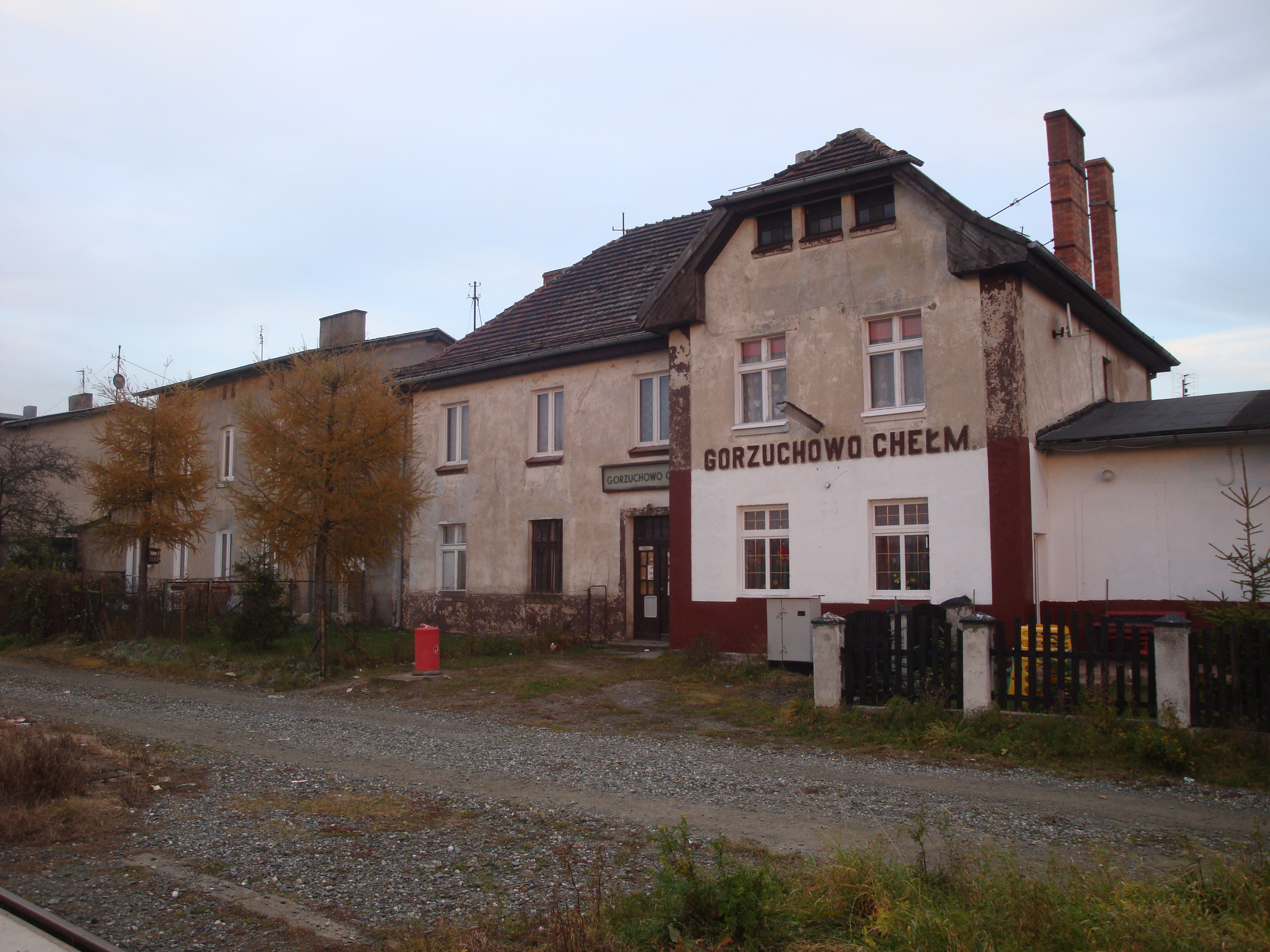
- Train station in Gorzuchowo

- Location within Poland
- Coordinates: 53°21′N 18°41′E
- Country: Poland
- Voivodeship: Kuyavian-Pomeranian
- County: Chełmno
- Gmina: Stolno
- Time zone: UTC+1 (CET)
  - Summer (DST): UTC+2 (CEST)
- Vehicle registration: CCH

Gorzuchowo [ɡɔʐuˈxɔvɔ] is a village in the administrative district of Gmina Stolno, within Chełmno County, Kuyavian-Pomeranian Voivodeship, in north-central Poland. It is located in Chełmno Land within the historic region of Pomerania.

== History ==
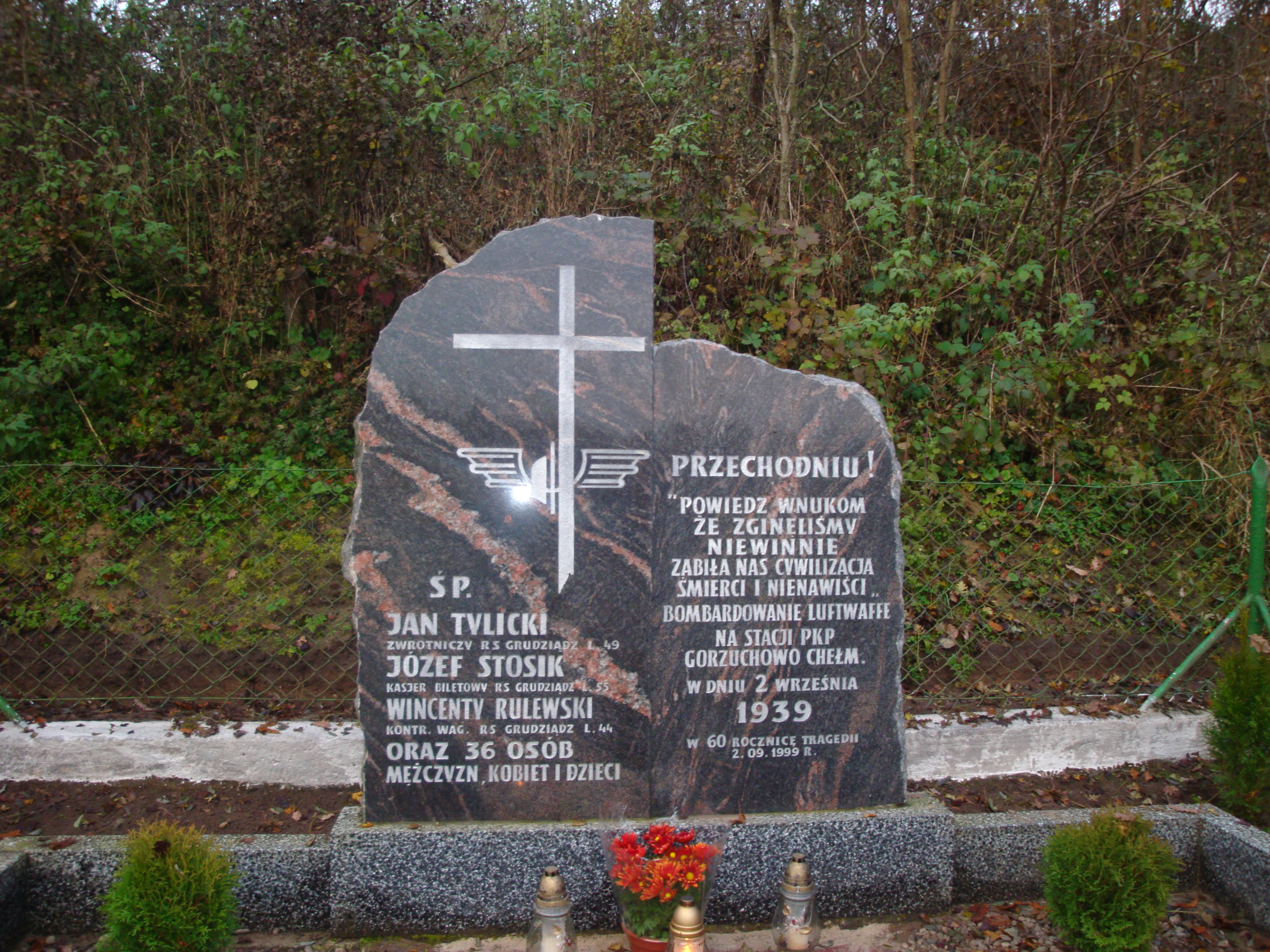
Mass grave of Poles killed in the German bombing of Gorzuchowo in 1939

On September 2, 1939, during the German invasion of Poland which started World War II, the German Luftwaffe bombed the local train station, killing 39 people, including railway workers and civilians (men, women and children). During the subsequent German occupation, Gorzuchowo was one of the sites of executions of Poles, carried out by the Germans in 1939 as part of the Intelligenzaktion. In 1941, the occupiers also carried out expulsions of Poles, who were sent to transit camps in the region, while their houses and farms were handed over to German colonists as part of the Lebensraum policy.

== Transport ==
The Voivodeship road 543 passes through the village, and the A1 motorway runs nearby, east of the village. There is also a train station in Gorzuchowo.

== Notable residents ==
- Józef Haller (1873–1960), Polish general
