= Bruki Kokocka =

- Village
- Location within Poland
- Coordinates: 53°15′35″N 18°22′0″E
- Country: Poland
- Voivodeship: Kuyavian-Pomeranian
- County: Chełmno
- Gmina: Unisław

Bruki Kokocka [ˈbruki kɔˈkɔt͡ska] is a village in the administrative district of Gmina Unisław, within Chełmno County, Kuyavian-Pomeranian Voivodeship, in north-central Poland.
