= Wichorze =

- Village
- Location within Poland
- Coordinates: 53°17′43″N 18°32′22″E
- Country: Poland
- Voivodeship: Kuyavian-Pomeranian
- County: Chełmno
- Gmina: Stolno

Wichorze [viˈxɔʐɛ] is a village in the administrative district of Gmina Stolno, within Chełmno County, Kuyavian-Pomeranian Voivodeship, in north-central Poland.
