= Maria Karłowska =

Polish Roman Catholic professed religious

Blessed Maria Karłowska
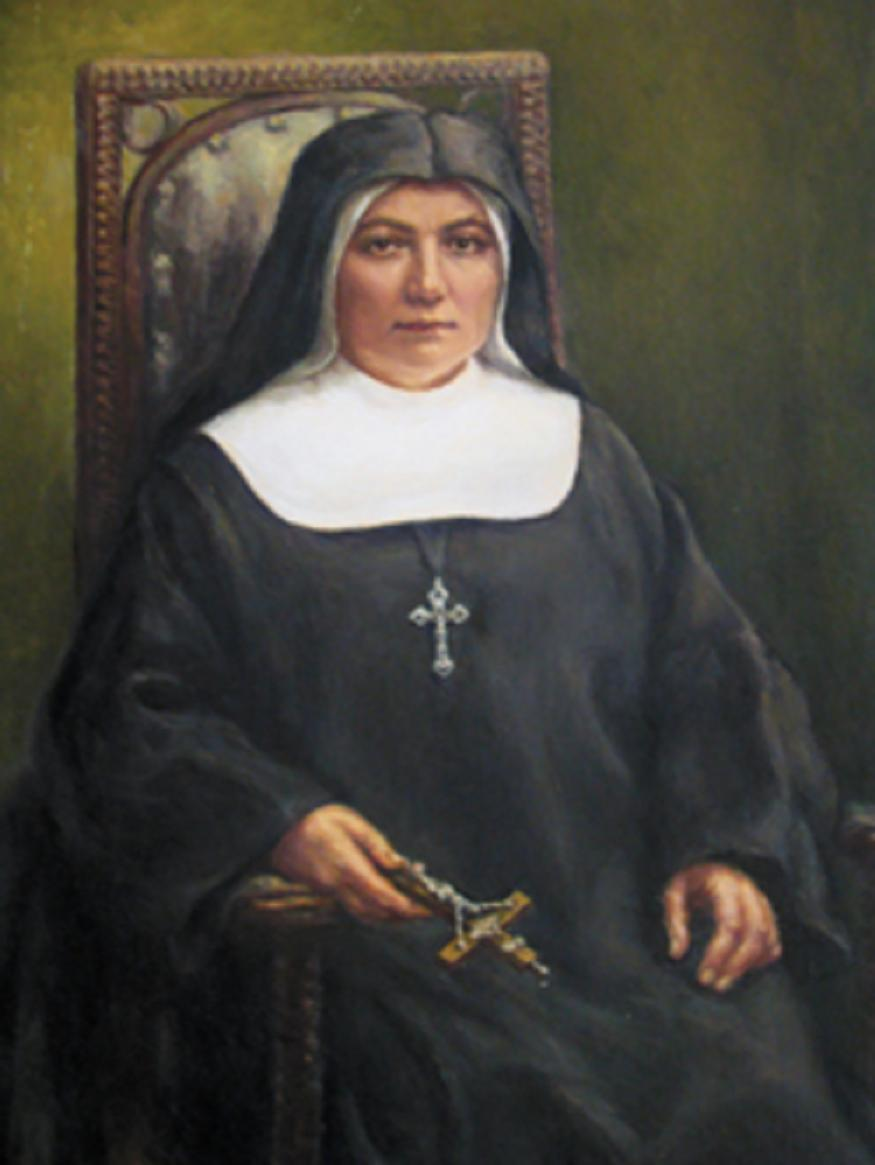

Religious
- Born: 4 September 1865; Karłowo, Grand Duchy of Posen, Kingdom of Prussia
- Died: 24 March 1935 (aged 69); Pniewite, Kujawsko-Pomorskie, Second Polish Republic
- Venerated in: Roman Catholic Church
- Beatified: 6 June 1997, Zakopane, Poland by Pope John Paul II
- Feast: 6 June
- Attributes: Religious habit
- Patronage: Sisters of the Divine Shepherd of Divine Providence

Maria Karłowska (4 September 1865 – 24 March 1935) – in religious Maria of Jesus Crucified – was a Polish Roman Catholic professed religious and the founder of the Sisters of the Divine Shepherd of Divine Providence. Karłowska worked with poor and abandoned people with an emphasis on girls and also tried to aid prostitutes avoid such a life and build another kind of life so used her order to reach out to such people to render assistance.

Her beatification cause culminated in Pope John Paul II presiding over her beatification on 6 June 1997 while on his apostolic visitation to Poland.

== Life ==
Maria Karłowska was born on 4 September 1865 in Poland as the eleventh child to Mateusz Karłowska and Eugenia Dembińska; she was baptized that same month and her godmother was Wanda. She made her First Communion in 1875 and in 1882 made a private vow – with the permission of her confessor – to remain chaste. Her parents both died in 1882 within the striking space of two months leaving her orphaned and alone. Her paternal cousin Stanisław Karłowski was a Discalced Carmelite priest. A second cousin was the artist Stanisława de Karłowska.

Karłowska became an apprentice seamstress in Berlin and started to collaborate with her elder sister as well as ill people in the area even after she had returned to Poland. In November 1892 she met a poor girl named Franke and this encounter inspired her to aid the neglected and abandoned after hearing her talk about her life. The nun fostered an intense devotion to the Sacred Heart. Her religious congregation was established on 8 September 1896 and she – as well as several others – made her solemn profession as a nun on 20 June 1902; she served as the Superior General from the founding until her death. Her order received diocesan approval on 13 April 1909. She received the Cross of Merit for her work in 1928.

Karłowska died on 24 March 1935 after being ill for some time and her remains were interred in the order's motherhouse after her funeral on 28 March; her remains were relocated on 31 August 1935. Her order received the decree of praise from Pope Paul VI on 24 May 1967. In 2005 there were 221 religious in 24 places across Poland and Kazakhstan.

== Beatification ==
The beatification process opened under Pope Paul VI on 17 March 1965 and she became titled as a Servant of God while the informative process commenced from 17 March 1965 until October 1982 in Toruń; the Congregation for the Causes of Saints validated the process on 27 March 1987 and then received the Positio in 1991. Theologians approved the dossier on 20 December 1994 as did the C.C.S. on 25 April 1995 before Pope John Paul II confirmed her heroic virtue and named her as Venerable on 11 July 1995.

The miracle for beatification was investigated and then received C.C.S. validation on 6 October 1995 before a medical board approved it on 27 June 1996. Theologians approved it on 6 December 1996 as did the C.C.S. on 25 February 1997; John Paul II approved this miracle on 8 April 1997 and beatified her two months later on 6 June while on his apostolic visit to Poland.
