= Stablewice =

- Village
- Location within Poland
- Coordinates: 53°13′21″N 18°25′28″E
- Country: Poland
- Voivodeship: Kuyavian-Pomeranian
- County: Chełmno
- Gmina: Unisław

Stablewice [stablɛˈvit͡sɛ] is a village in the administrative district of Gmina Unisław, within Chełmno County, Kuyavian-Pomeranian Voivodeship, in north-central Poland.
