= Strucfoń =

- Village
- Location within Poland
- Coordinates: 53°16′25″N 18°41′22″E
- Country: Poland
- Voivodeship: Kuyavian-Pomeranian
- County: Chełmno
- Gmina: Lisewo
- Time zone: UTC+1 (CET)
  - Summer (DST): UTC+2 (CEST)
- Vehicle registration: CCH

Strucfoń [ˈstrut͡sfɔɲ] is a village in the administrative district of Gmina Lisewo, within Chełmno County, Kuyavian-Pomeranian Voivodeship, in north-central Poland. It is located in Chełmno Land within the historic region of Pomerania.

== Transport ==
The Polish A1 motorway runs nearby, east of the village.
