= Gołoty, Kuyavian-Pomeranian Voivodeship =

Gołoty
- Village
- Location within Poland
- Coordinates: 53°14′N 18°25′E
- Country: Poland
- Voivodeship: Kuyavian-Pomeranian
- County: Chełmno
- Gmina: Unisław

Gołoty [ɡɔˈwɔtɨ] is a village in the administrative district of Gmina Unisław, within Chełmno County, Kuyavian-Pomeranian Voivodeship, in north-central Poland.
