= Bartlewo, Kuyavian-Pomeranian Voivodeship =

Bartlewo
- Village
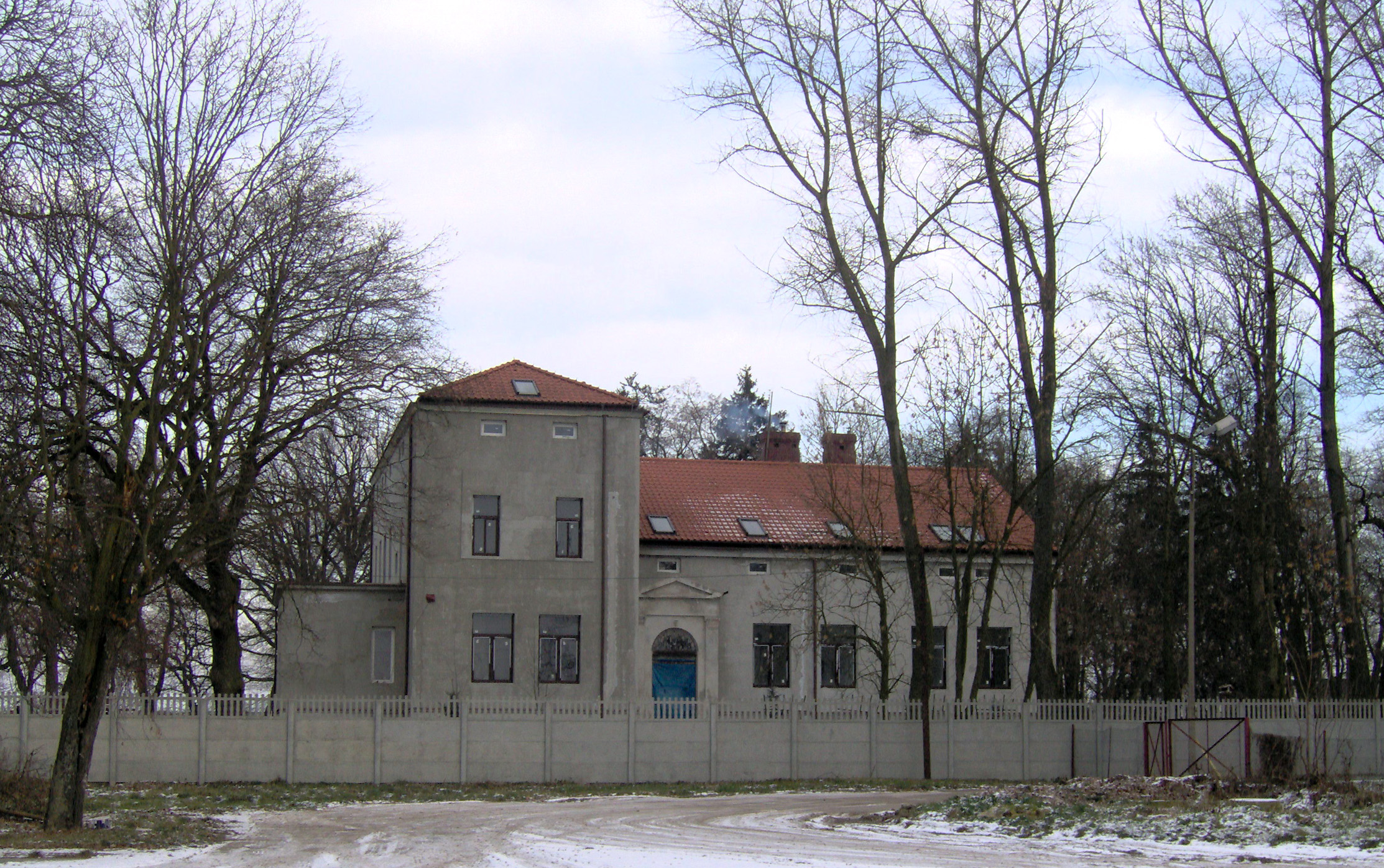
- Old manor house in Bartlewo

- Location within Poland
- Coordinates: 53°17′N 18°36′E
- Country: Poland
- Voivodeship: Kuyavian-Pomeranian
- County: Chełmno
- Gmina: Lisewo
- Population: 280
- Time zone: UTC+1 (CET)
  - Summer (DST): UTC+2 (CEST)
- Vehicle registration: CCH

Bartlewo [barˈtlɛvɔ] is a village in the administrative district of Gmina Lisewo, within Chełmno County, Kuyavian-Pomeranian Voivodeship, in north-central Poland.

== History ==
During the German occupation (World War II), in 1939, local Polish teachers were murdered by the Germans in a massacre of Poles committed in nearby Klamry as part of the Intelligenzaktion.
