= Drzonowo, Kuyavian-Pomeranian Voivodeship =

Drzonowo
- Village
- Location within Poland
- Coordinates: 53°15′24″N 18°41′46″E
- Country: Poland
- Voivodeship: Kuyavian-Pomeranian
- County: Chełmno
- Gmina: Lisewo
- Time zone: UTC+1 (CET)
  - Summer (DST): UTC+2 (CEST)
- Vehicle registration: CCH

Drzonowo [dʐɔˈnɔvɔ] is a village in the administrative district of Gmina Lisewo, within Chełmno County, Kuyavian-Pomeranian Voivodeship, in north-central Poland. It is located in the Chełmno Land in the historic region of Pomerania.

== History ==
During the German occupation (World War II), in 1939, local Polish teachers were murdered by the Germans in a massacre of Poles committed in nearby Klamry as part of the Intelligenzaktion. In January 1942, the occupiers also carried out expulsions of Poles, whose houses were then handed over to German colonists as part of the Lebensraum policy.

== Transport ==
The Polish A1 motorway runs nearby, east of the village.
