= Pniewite =

- Village
- Location within Poland
- Coordinates: 53°19′37″N 18°39′50″E
- Country: Poland
- Voivodeship: Kuyavian-Pomeranian
- County: Chełmno
- Gmina: Lisewo
- Population: 410
- Time zone: UTC+1 (CET)
  - Summer (DST): UTC+2 (CEST)
- Vehicle registration: CCH

Pniewite [pɲɛˈvitɛ] is a village in the administrative district of Gmina Lisewo, within Chełmno County, Kuyavian-Pomeranian Voivodeship, in north-central Poland. It is located in the Chełmno Land in the historic region of Pomerania.

== History ==
The village was established in 1250.

During the German occupation (World War II), Pniewite was one of the sites of executions of Poles, carried out by the Germans in 1939 as part of the Intelligenzaktion. Local Polish teachers were murdered by the Germans in a massacre of Poles committed in nearby Klamry, also as part of the Intelligenzaktion.
