= Gmina Lisewo =

Gmina Lisewo Lisewo Commune
- Gmina
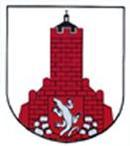
- Coat of arms
- Interactive map of Gmina Lisewo
- Coordinates (Lisewo): 53°17′38″N 18°41′19″E
- Country: Poland
- Voivodeship: Kuyavian-Pomeranian
- County: Chełmno
- Seat: Lisewo

Area
  - Total: 86.2 km^{2} (33.3 sq mi)

Population (2006)
  - Total: 5,259
  - Density: 61.0/km^{2} (158/sq mi)
- Website: http://www.lisewo.com

Gmina Lisewo is a rural gmina (administrative district) in Chełmno County, Kuyavian-Pomeranian Voivodeship, in north-central Poland. Its seat is the village of Lisewo, which lies approximately 20 kilometres (12 mi) south-east of Chełmno and 30 km (19 mi) north of Toruń.

The gmina covers an area of 86.2 square kilometres (33.3 sq mi), and as of 2006 its total population is 5,259.

== Villages ==
Gmina Lisewo contains the villages and settlements of Bartlewo, Błachta, Chrusty, Drzonowo, Kamlarki, Kornatowo, Krajęcin, Krusin, Linowiec, Lipienek, Lisewo, Malankowo, Mgoszcz, Piątkowo, Pniewite, Strucfoń, Tytlewo and Wierzbowo.

== Neighbouring gminas ==
Gmina Lisewo is bordered by the gminas of Chełmża, Papowo Biskupie, Płużnica and Stolno.
