= Stolno, Kuyavian-Pomeranian Voivodeship =

Stolno
- Village
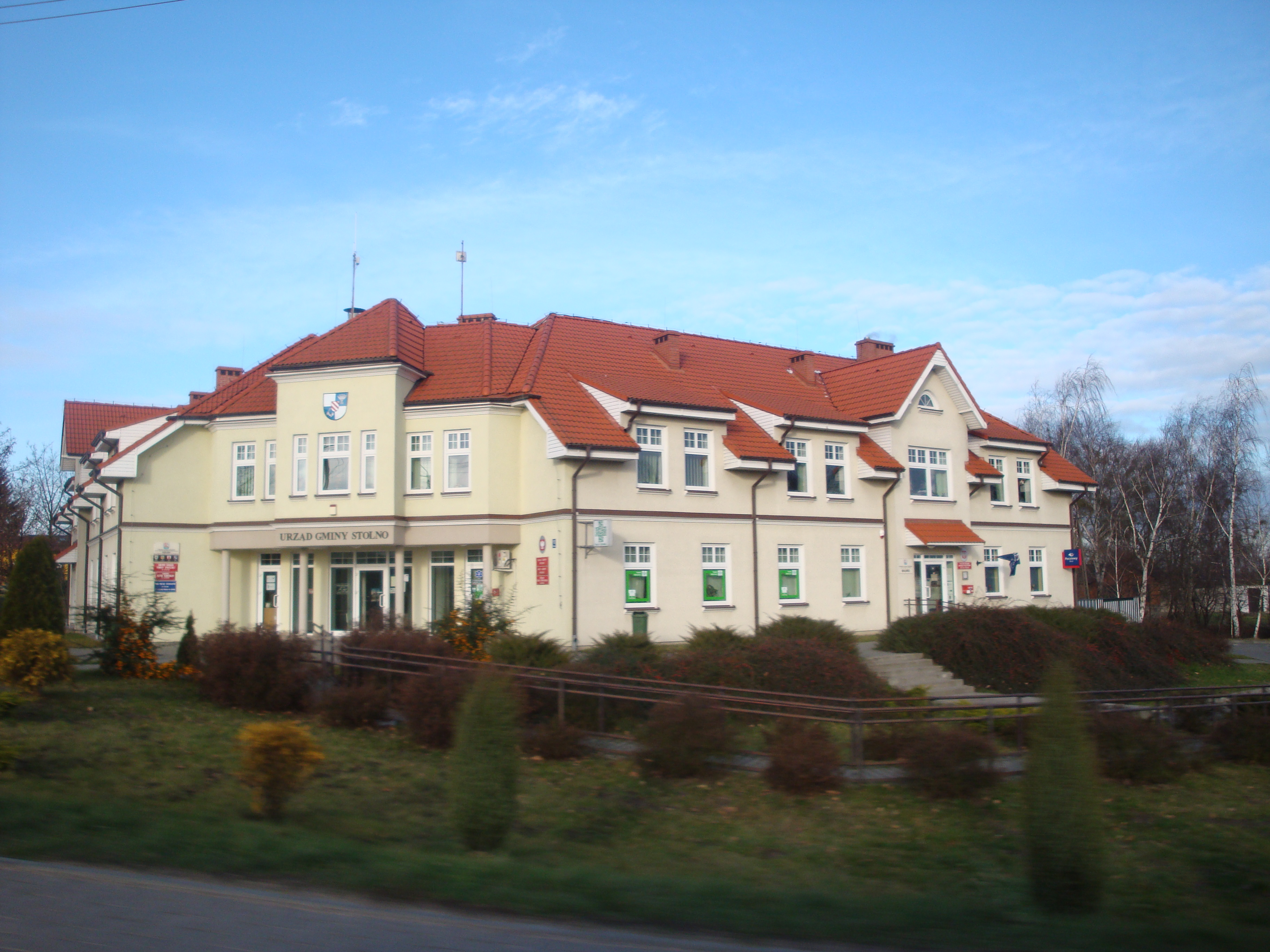
- Gmina office in Stolno

- Location within Poland
- Coordinates: 53°19′18″N 18°30′22″E
- Country: Poland
- Voivodeship: Kuyavian-Pomeranian
- County: Chełmno
- Gmina: Stolno

Population
  - Total: 830
- Time zone: UTC+1 (CET)
  - Summer (DST): UTC+2 (CEST)
- Vehicle registration: CCH

Stolno [ˈstɔlnɔ] is a village in Chełmno County, Kuyavian-Pomeranian Voivodeship, in north-central Poland. It is the seat of the gmina (administrative district) called Gmina Stolno. It is located in Chełmno Land within the historic region of Pomerania.

There are several bunkers and forts from World War I in Stolno.

== Transport ==
Stolno is located at the intersection of Polish National roads 55 and 91 and the Voivodeship road 548.
