= Klęczkowo, Kuyavian-Pomeranian Voivodeship =

Klęczkowo
- Village
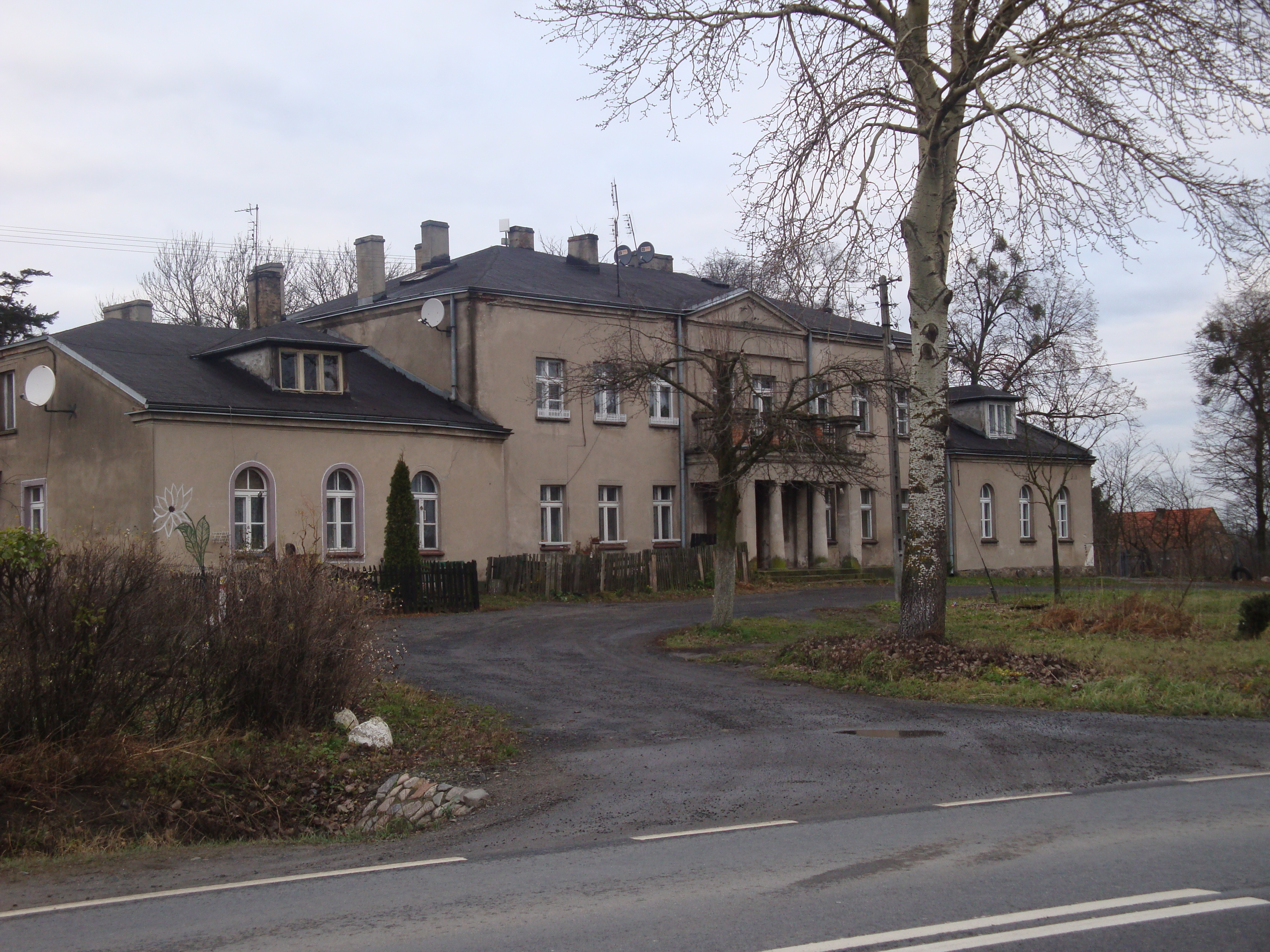
- Old manor house in Klęczkowo

- Location within Poland
- Coordinates: 53°23′10″N 18°40′45″E
- Country: Poland
- Voivodeship: Kuyavian-Pomeranian
- County: Chełmno
- Gmina: Stolno
- Time zone: UTC+1 (CET)
  - Summer (DST): UTC+2 (CEST)
- Vehicle registration: CCH

Klęczkowo [klɛnt͡ʂˈkɔvɔ] is a village in the administrative district of Gmina Stolno, within Chełmno County, Kuyavian-Pomeranian Voivodeship, in north-central Poland. It is located in Chełmno Land within the historic region of Pomerania.

== Transport ==
The Polish A1 motorway and National road 55 pass through the village.

== Notable people ==
- Wojciech Stanisław Leski (1702–1758), Bishop of Chełmno
- Szczepan Józef Gółkowski (1787–1871), Polish printer and publisher
