= Unisław, Kuyavian-Pomeranian Voivodeship =

Unisław
- Village
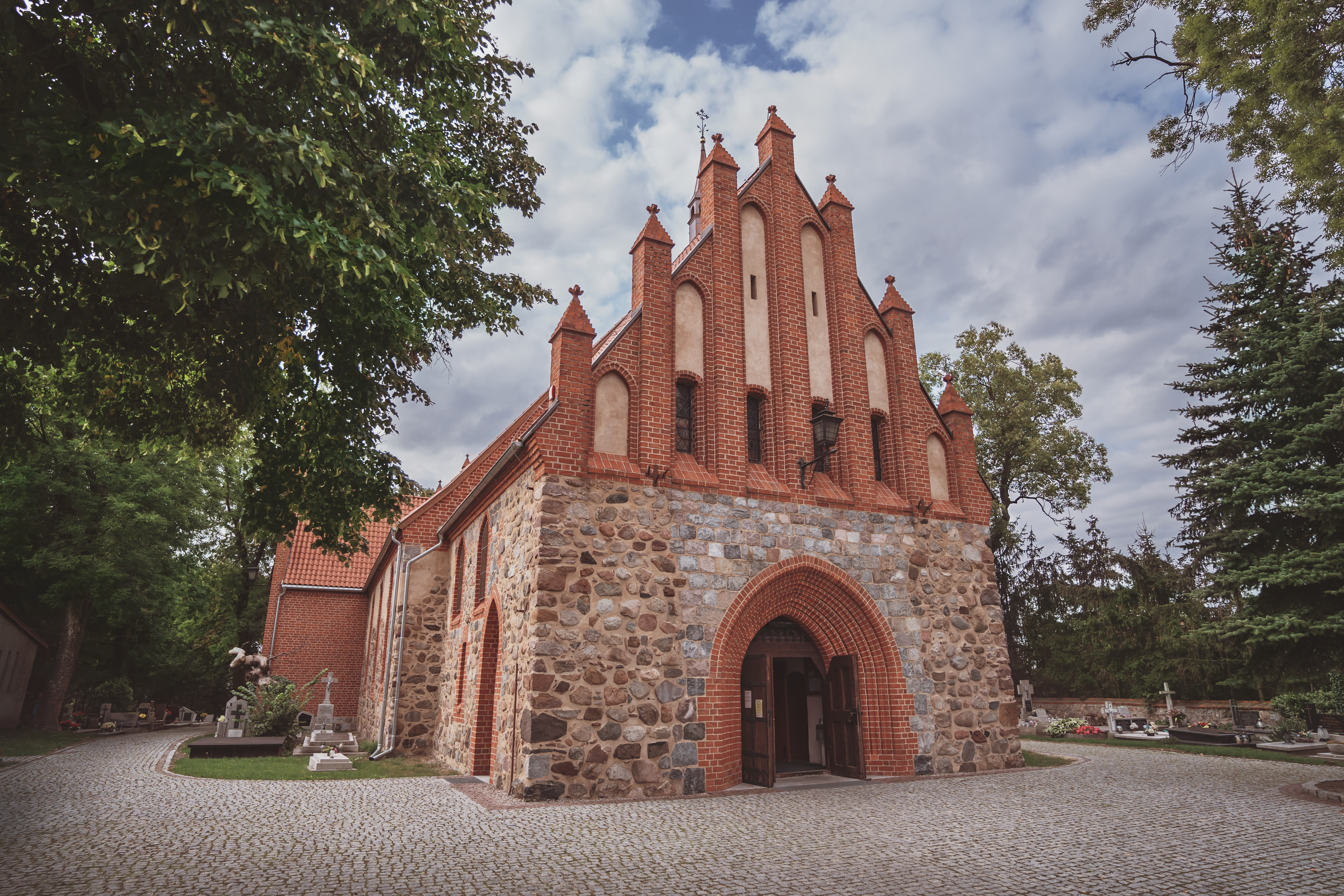
- Saint Bartholomew Church

- Location within Poland
- Coordinates: 53°12′37″N 18°23′13″E
- Country: Poland
- Voivodeship: Kuyavian-Pomeranian
- County: Chełmno
- Gmina: Unisław
- Population: 3,490
- Time zone: UTC+1 (CET)
  - Summer (DST): UTC+2 (CEST)
- Vehicle registration: CCH

Unisław (Polish pronunciation: [uˈɲiswaf]) is a village in Chełmno County, Kuyavian-Pomeranian Voivodeship, in north-central Poland. It is the seat of the gmina (administrative district) called Gmina Unisław. It is located in the Chełmno Land in the historic region of Pomerania.

Unisław and its surroundings is one of the main areas of peppermint cultivation in Poland, and the Unisław peppermint is an officially protected traditional food, as designated by the Ministry of Agriculture and Rural Development of Poland.

== History ==
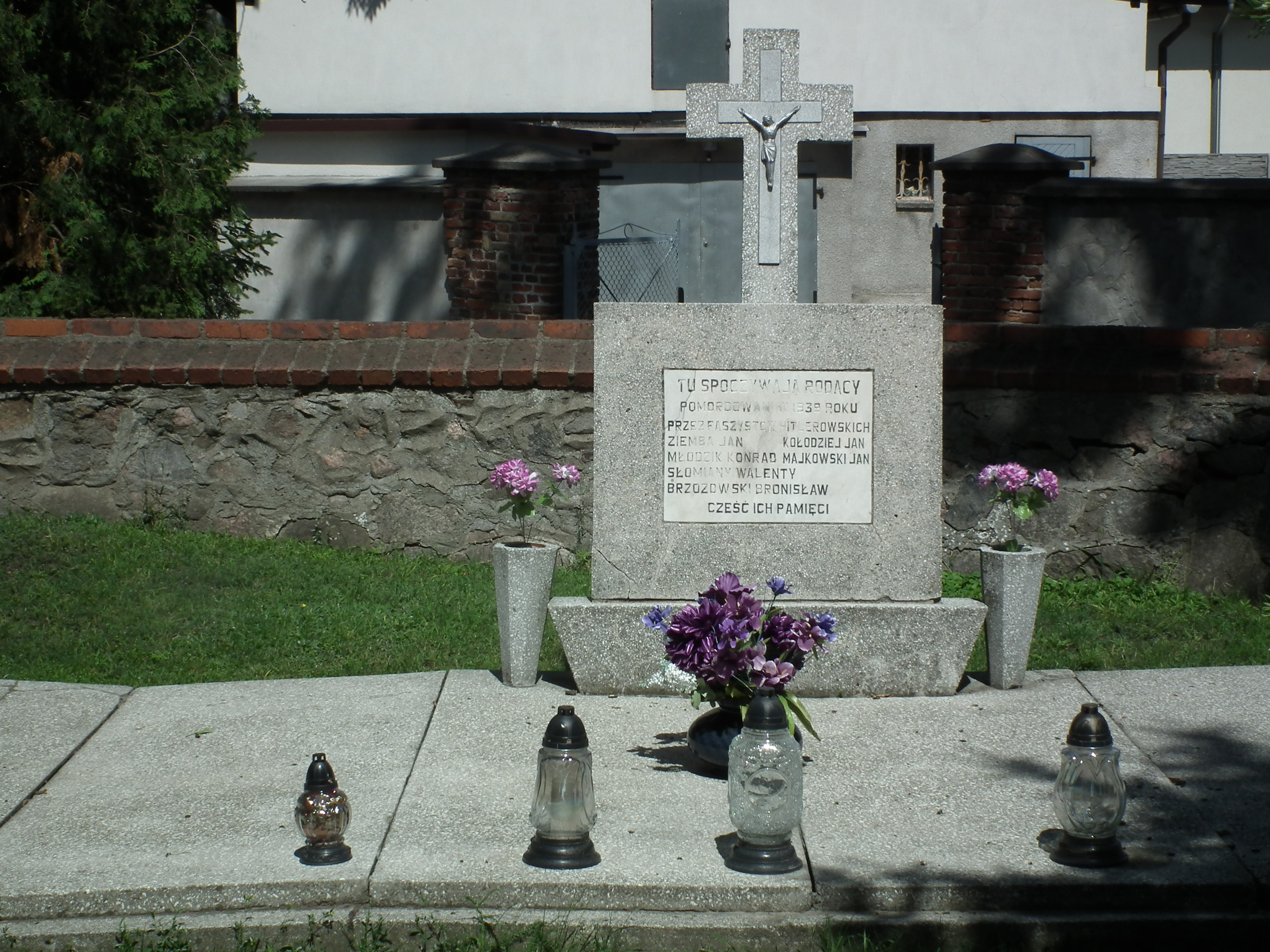
Mass grave of local Poles murdered by the Germans during World War II

The village was mentioned in a document of Duke Konrad I of Masovia in 1222.

During the German occupation (World War II), in 1939, many Poles from Unisław, including teachers, priests and the local school principal, were murdered by the Germans in large massacres of Poles committed in nearby Klamry, Płutowo and Małe Czyste as part of the Intelligenzaktion. In October 1940, the occupiers also carried out expulsions of Poles, whose farms were then handed over to German colonists as part of the Lebensraum policy. In 1942, the Germans changed the name of the village to Kulmischwenzlau in attempt to erase traces of Polish origin. The original name was restored after the occupation ended in 1945.

== Sports ==
The local football club is Unislavia Unisław. It competes in the lower leagues.
