= Gmina Stolno =

Gmina Stolno Stolno Commune
- Gmina
- Coat of arms
- Interactive map of Gmina Stolno
- Coordinates (Stolno): 53°19′N 18°30′E
- Country: Poland
- Voivodeship: Kuyavian-Pomeranian
- County: Chełmno
- Seat: Stolno

Area
  - Total: 98.43 km^{2} (38.00 sq mi)

Population (2006)
  - Total: 5,110
  - Density: 51.9/km^{2} (134/sq mi)
- Website: https://www.stolno.com.pl

Gmina Stolno is a rural gmina (administrative district) in Chełmno County, Kuyavian-Pomeranian Voivodeship, in north-central Poland. Its seat is the village of Stolno, which lies approximately 8 kilometres (5 mi) south-east of Chełmno, 33 km (21 mi) north of Toruń, and 41 km (25 mi) north-east of Bydgoszcz.

The gmina covers an area of 98.43 square kilometres (38.0 sq mi), and as of 2006 its total population is 5,110.

== Villages ==
Gmina Stolno contains the villages and settlements of Cepno, Gorzuchowo, Grubno, Klęczkowo, Kobyły, Łyniec, Małe Czyste, Nałęcz, Obory, Paparzyn, Pilewice, Robakowo, Rybieniec, Sarnowo, Stolno, Trzebiełuch, Wabcz, Wabcz-Kolonia, Wichorze, Wielkie Czyste, Zakrzewo and Zalesie.

== Neighbouring gminas ==
Gmina Stolno is bordered by the town of Chełmno and by the gminas of Chełmno, Grudziądz, Kijewo Królewskie, Lisewo, Papowo Biskupie and Płużnica.
