= Krusin, Kuyavian-Pomeranian Voivodeship =

Krusin
- Village
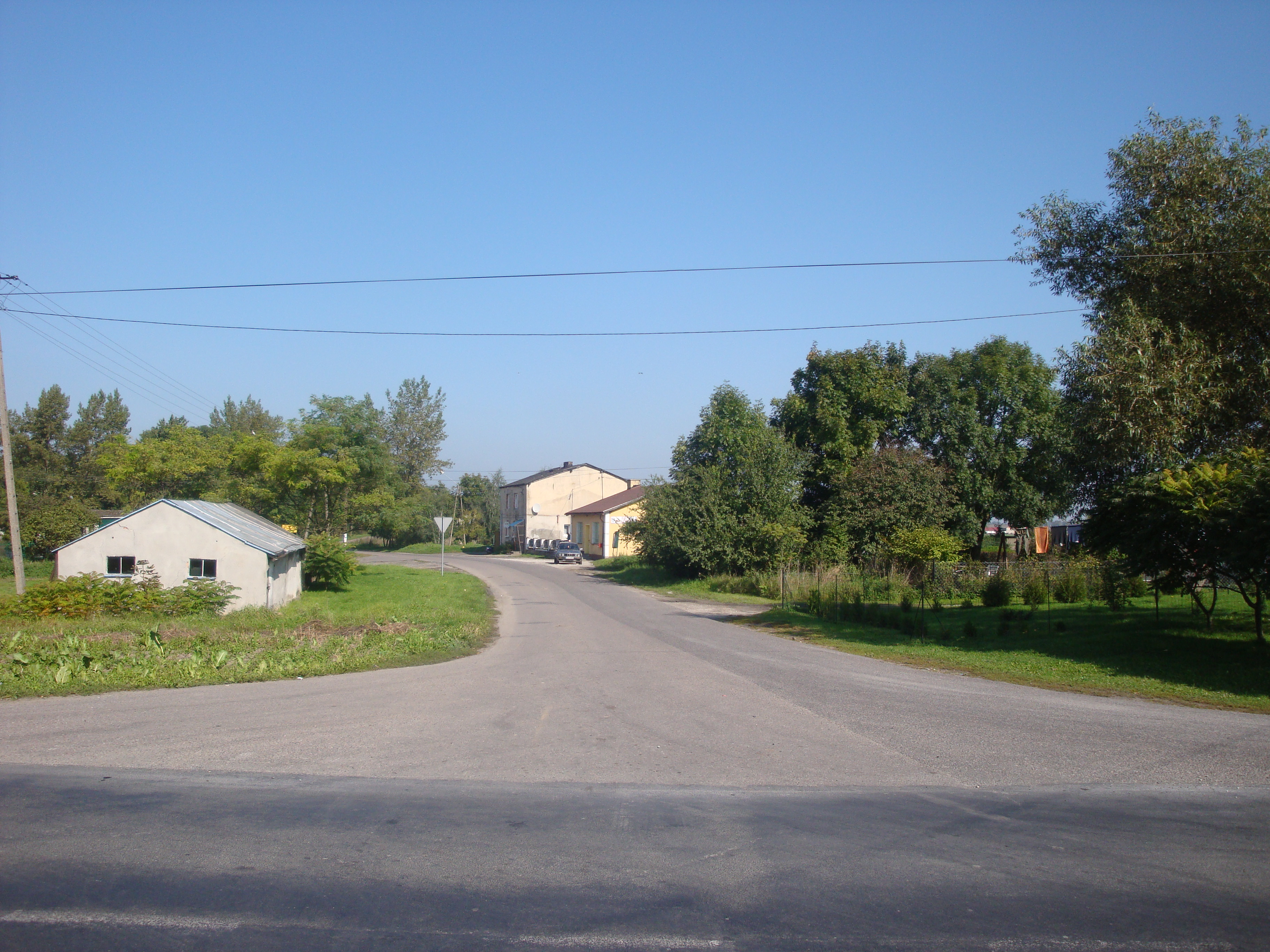
- Road 548 in village

- Location within Poland
- Coordinates: 53°18′42.3″N 18°37′11.3″E
- Country: Poland
- Voivodeship: Kuyavian-Pomeranian
- County: Chełmno
- Gmina: Lisewo

Krusin [ˈkruɕin] is a village in the administrative district of Gmina Lisewo, within Chełmno County, Kuyavian-Pomeranian Voivodeship, in north-central Poland.
