= Nałęcz, Kuyavian-Pomeranian Voivodeship =

Nałęcz
- Village
- Location within Poland
- Coordinates: 53°18′10″N 18°30′20″E
- Country: Poland
- Voivodeship: Kuyavian-Pomeranian
- County: Chełmno
- Gmina: Stolno

Nałęcz [ˈnawɛnt͡ʂ] is a village in the administrative district of Gmina Stolno, within Chełmno County, Kuyavian-Pomeranian Voivodeship, in north-central Poland.
