= Gmina Unisław =

Gmina Unisław Unisław Commune
- Gmina
- Coat of arms

- Location within Poland Location within Europe
- Coordinates (Unisław): 53°12′37″N 18°23′13″E
- Country: Poland
- Voivodeship: Kuyavian-Pomeranian
- County: Chełmno
- Seat: Unisław

Area
  - Total: 72.45 km^{2} (27.97 sq mi)

Population (2006)
  - Total: 6,766
  - Density: 93.39/km^{2} (241.9/sq mi)
- Website: http://www.unislaw.pl

Gmina Unisław is a rural gmina (administrative district) in Chełmno County, Kuyavian-Pomeranian Voivodeship, in north-central Poland. Its seat is the village of Unisław, which lies approximately 18 kilometres (11 mi) south of Chełmno, 25 km (16 mi) north-west of Toruń, and 28 km (17 mi) east of Bydgoszcz.

The gmina covers an area of 72.45 square kilometres (28.0 sq mi), and as of 2006 its total population is 6,766.

== Villages ==
Gmina Unisław contains the villages and settlements of Błoto, Bruki Kokocka, Bruki Unisławskie, Głażewo, Gołoty, Grzybno, Kokocko, Raciniewo, Stablewice and Unisław.

== Neighbouring gminas ==
Gmina Unisław is bordered by the gminas of Chełmno, Dąbrowa Chełmińska, Kijewo Królewskie, Łubianka, Pruszcz and Zławieś Wielka.
