= Chełmno County =

Chełmno County Powiat chełmiński
- County
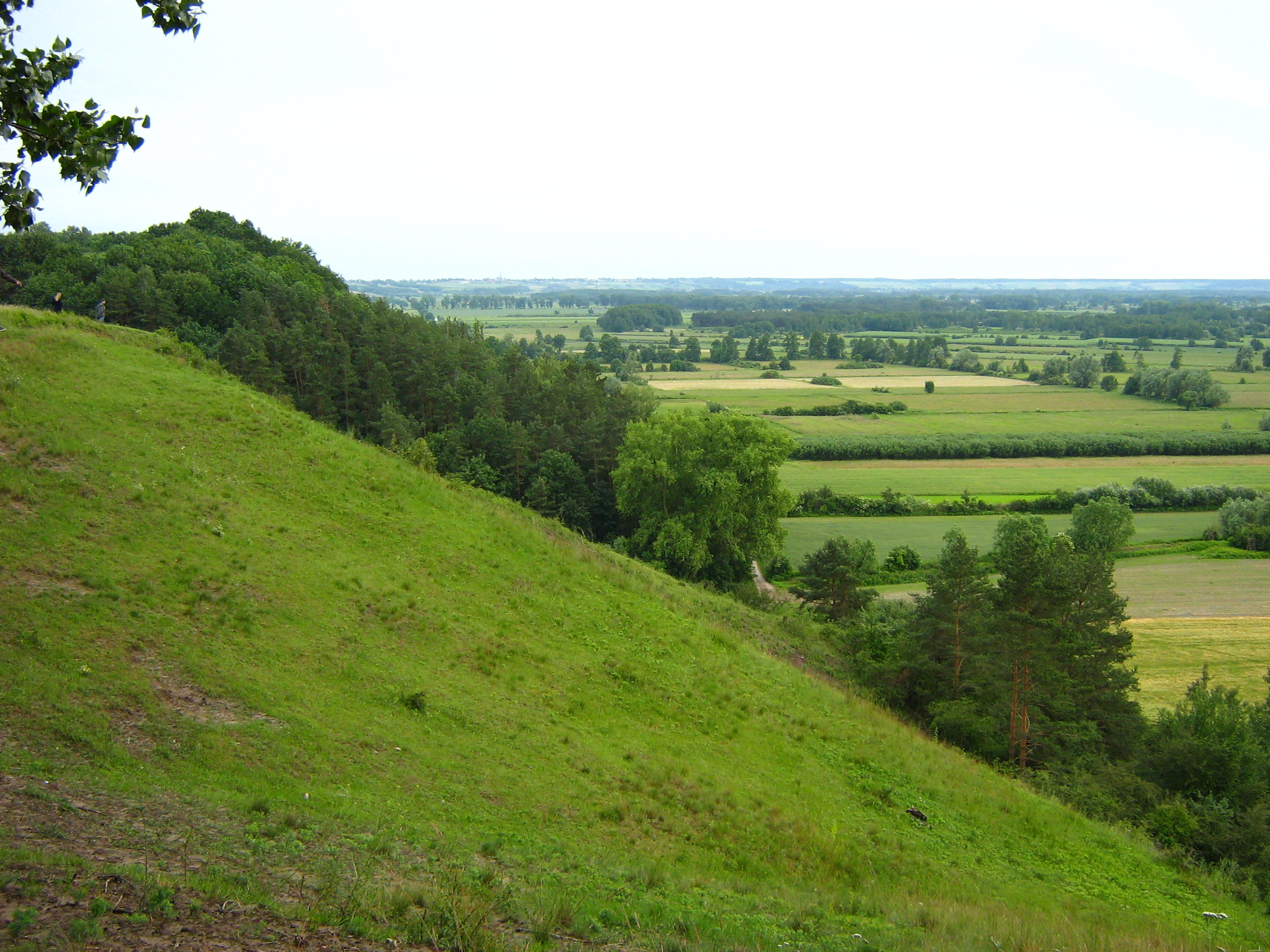

- Flag Coat of arms

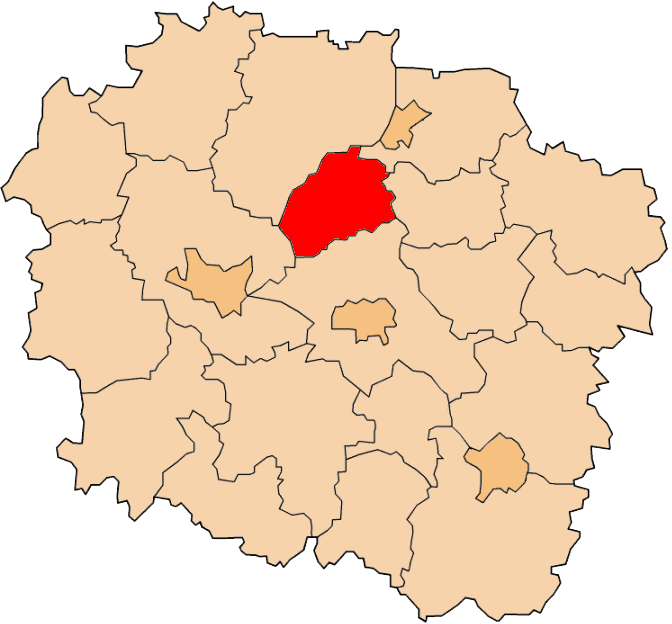
- Location within the voivodeship

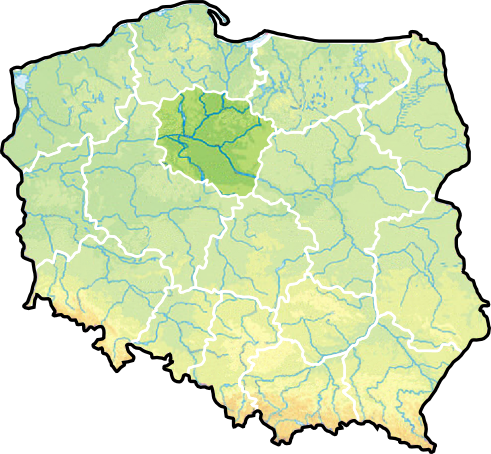
- Voivodeship on a map of Poland
- Coordinates (Chełmno): 53°21′57″N 18°25′22″E
- Country: Poland
- Voivodeship: Kuyavian-Pomeranian
- Seat: Chełmno
- Gminas: Total 7 (incl. 1 urban): Chełmno; Gmina Chełmno; Gmina Kijewo Królewskie; Gmina Lisewo; Gmina Papowo Biskupie; Gmina Stolno; Gmina Unisław

Area
  - Total: 527.62 km^{2} (203.72 sq mi)

Population (2019)
  - Total: 52,018
  - Density: 98.590/km^{2} (255.35/sq mi)
  - Urban: 19,605
  - Rural: 32,413
- Car plates: CCH
- Website: www.powiat-chelmno.pl

Chełmno County (Polish: powiat chełmiński) is a unit of territorial administration and local government (powiat) in Kuyavian-Pomeranian Voivodeship, north-central Poland. It came into being on 1 January 1999, as a result of the Polish local government reforms adopted in 1998. Its administrative seat and only town is Chełmno, which lies 40 km (25 mi) north of Toruń and 40 km (25 mi) north-east of Bydgoszcz.

The county covers an area of 527.62 square kilometres (203.7 sq mi). As of 2019 its total population is 52,018, out of which the population of Chełmno is 19,605 and the rural population is 32,413.

The county includes the protected area called Chełmno Landscape Park, which stretches along the right bank of the Vistula river.

== Neighbouring counties ==
Chełmno County is bordered by Świecie County to the north, Grudziądz County and Wąbrzeźno County to the east, Toruń County to the south, and Bydgoszcz County to the south-west.

== Administrative divisions ==
The county is subdivided into seven gminas (one urban and six rural). These are listed in the following table, in descending order of population.

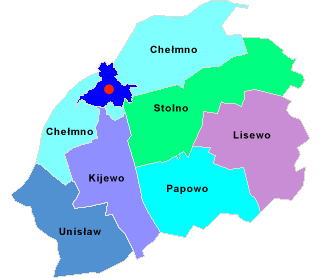
Division of Chełmno County

Gmina	Type	Area (km^{2})	Population (2019)	Seat
Chełmno	urban	13.6	19,605	
Gmina Unisław	rural	72.5	6,967	Unisław
Gmina Chełmno	rural	114.1	6,084	Chełmno *
Gmina Stolno	rural	98.4	5,278	Stolno
Gmina Lisewo	rural	86.2	5,212	Lisewo
Gmina Kijewo Królewskie	rural	72.2	4,529	Kijewo Królewskie
Gmina Papowo Biskupie	rural	70.4	4,343	Papowo Biskupie
* seat not part of the gmina
