= Jolanta Kowalska =

Polish soprano

Jolanta Kowalska (born 29 April 1983) is an operatic Polish soprano.

== Life ==
Born à Kraków, Kowalska studied singing under Agnieszka Monasterska at the Academy of Music in Kraków (where she graduated with distinction) and continued at the Guildhall School of Music and Drama in London (under Ameral Gunson).

She has regularly participated in master classes, including with Barbara Schlick, Paul Esswood, Elisabeth von Magnus, Teresa Żylis-Gara, Helena Łazarska and Ryszard Karczykowski.

== Scholarships, prizes and awards ==
Kowalska has received scholarships from the Polish Ministry of Culture and Heritage (2004-2005, 2005–2006, 2006–2007) and from the City of Krakow ("Creative" and "Young Poland" scholarships, 2009).

She won a first prize in the international competitions The Thelma King The Thelma King (2009) and Bach Singer's Prize Bach Singer's Prize in London (2008).

She was awarded a Special Prize at the International Johann Sebastian Bach Competition in Leipzig (2008), the Ada Scherrer Prize and the Bach Singer's Prize (2008), the Ada Sari Prize in Nowy Sącz (2009) and the "Jurica Murai" Prize for the best performance at the 39th Festival "Varaždin Baroque Evenings" (Varaždinske barokne večeri) (Varaždin, Croatia in 2009.

She was also awarded other prizes and runners-up at the 9th Imrich Godin International Singing Competition "Iuventus Canti" (Vráble, Slovakia , 2007) and the Mozart Singing Competition in London (2008).

She won third prize at the Halina Halska National Singing Competition (2005) and second prize at the Artistic Singing Interpretation Competition of Poland (2007).

== Activities ==
Kowalska has worked with the Krakow Chamber Opera and since 2003 has been a member of the Capella Cracoviensis. She has twice taken part in the Chichester Festivities under the direction of Paul Esswood.

She was on the programme of the fourteenth Bach Festival of St Anne's Lutheran Church in London, where she gave a solo recital of Spanish music at the National Gallery, and also sang at Bachfest organised by the London Bach Society at the National Portrait Gallery in London. Solo participation in the tour of the German-speaking Krakow choir "Kantorei Sankt Barbara" with the Jerusalem Baroque Orchestra).

In June 2011, she participated in the concert series Polski Barok as part of the EU-supported programme Verba et Voces with works by Bartłomiej Pękiel, Gorczycki, and Marcin Mielcewski.

In October 2011, she participated in Handel's Alcina during the Opera Rara festival in Krakow, with Marc Minkowski, who conducted the Les Musiciens du Louvre Grenoble.

In March 2012, she toured with Les Musiciens du Louvre Grenoble which took her to the Maison de la culture de Grenoble, at the Alte Oper Francfurt, to the Théâtre Musical of Besançon, at the Centro Cultural Miguel Delibes de Valladolid, at the Palau de la Musica de Valencia, at the Auditorio de la Diputacion in Alicante, at the Auditorium Nacional de Música de Madrid, at the Krakow Philharmonic, and at the Salle Pleyel in Paris.

== Recordings ==
- Kantorei Sankt Barbara, Jan Dismas Zelenka - Missa fidei ZWV 6 (2016)
- Capella Czestochoviensis, Polish Sacred Music Gaude Mater, 2011
- Pueri Cantores Tarnovienses and Tarnów chamber orchestra, Completorium by Grzegorz Gerwazy Gorczycki (~1667-1734) under the conduct of Grzegorz Piekarz (2010)
- Kantorei Sankt Barbara (Muzyka u św. Barbary) Johann Sebastian Bach - Magnificat conducted by Wiesław Delimat (2008)
