= Chełmno Academy =

Chełmno Academy Akademia Chełmińska
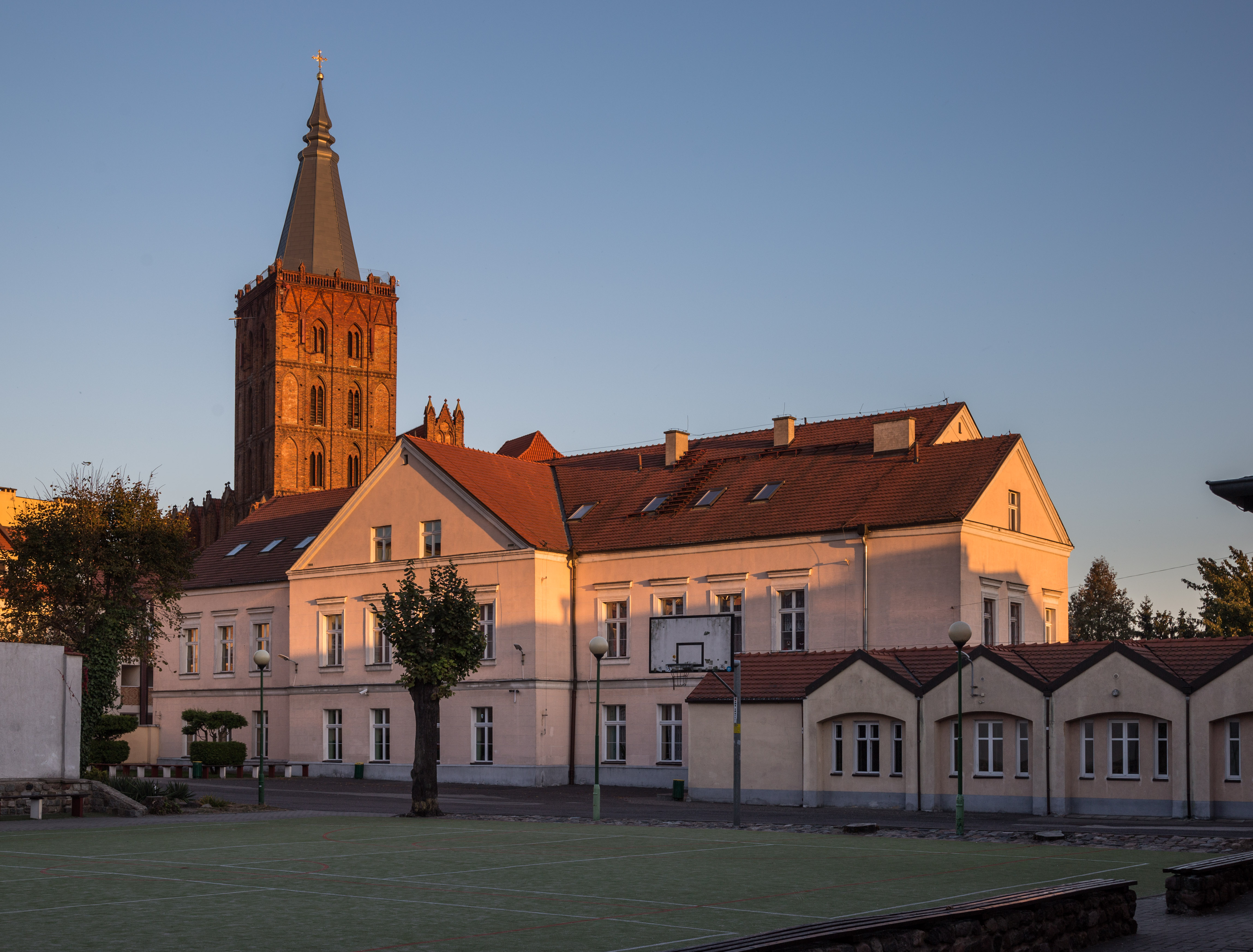
- With the Church of the Assumption
- Chełmno, Poland

Information
- Other names: Gelehrte Schnie (after 1818)
- Established: 1692
- Closed: 1818

The Chełmno Academy was a school founded in the 17th century in Chełmno, Poland. It operated until 1818 and succeeded multiple prior educational institutions founded in that city.

== History ==
The first attempt to establish an academy in Chełmno occurred in 1386 when Pope Urban VI granted rights to the Teutonic Order for such a purpose. This institution was meant to follow the model of the University of Bologna, but it suffered due to conflicts between Poland and the Teutonic Order and was never fully implemented. The institution was reestablished in 1473 by Casimir IV Jagiellon but was again closed in 1550 due to conflicts between the Protestants and Catholics.

In 1692, the institution took the form of a secondary school with the support of Bishop Jan Małachowski and the local Vincentians. In the following year, the school struggled to recruit high quality instructors. According to Fr. Wiktor Prądzyński, instructors were paid between 50 and 380 florins depending on the courses taught. By 1772, the school had two departments and was located in a baroque building on Franciszkańska Street. During this time, the school also established a relationship with the Krakow Academy and became an "academic colony". After the partitions of Poland, the authorities prevented the academy from hiring instructors from Krakow. The school saw declining enrollment and support, and it was converted into an interdenominational school by 1818. In the century prior to 1815, several dozen students of Scottish descent were also educated at the academy.

In the modern period, the former academy facilities house the Lower Secondary School No.1.

== Notable people ==
- Grzegorz Gerwazy Gorczycki, instructor of poetry and rector

== See also ==
- History of education in Poland
- List of schools in Poland
