= Chełmno =

Town in Kuyavian-Pomeranian, Poland

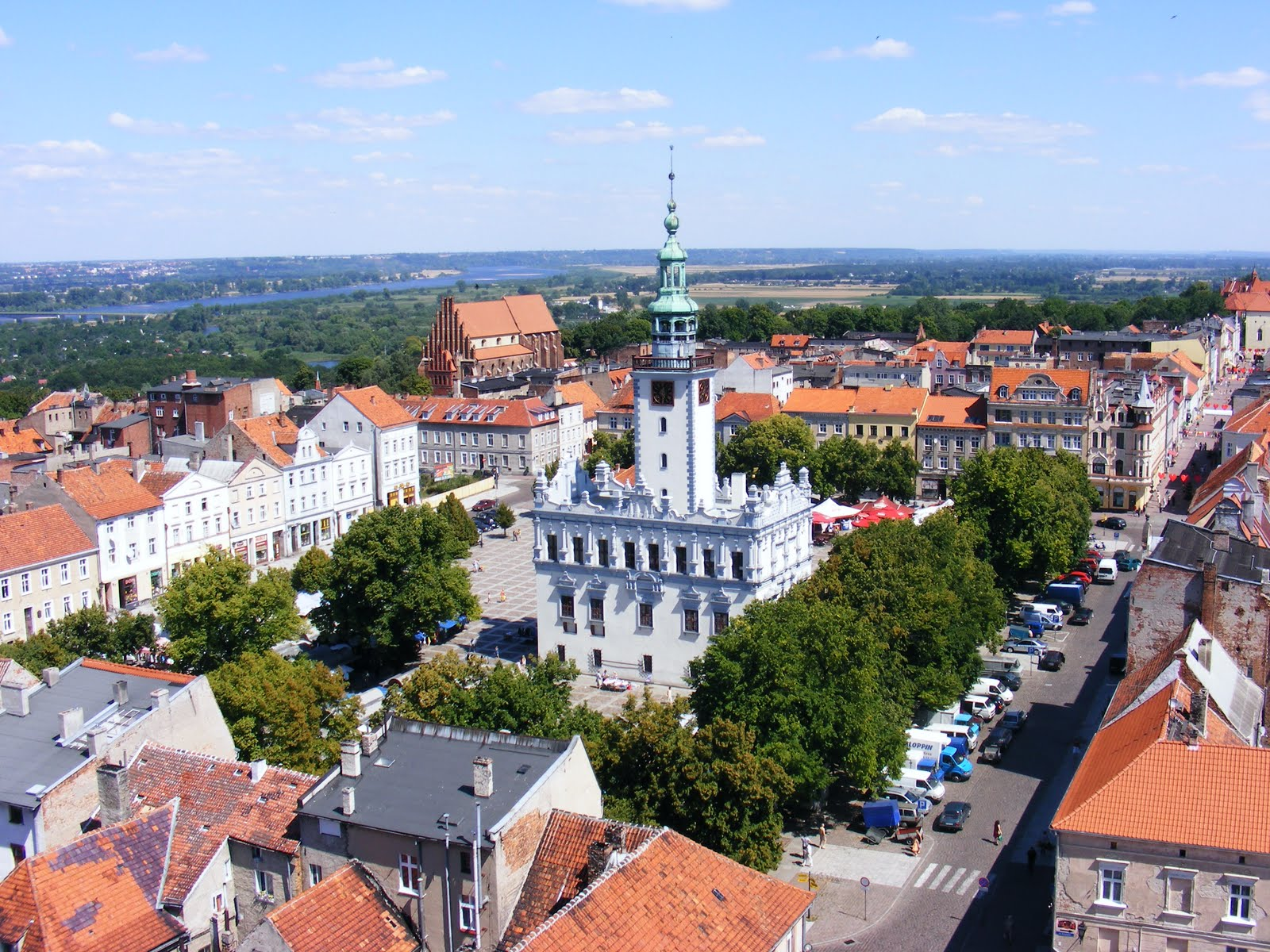
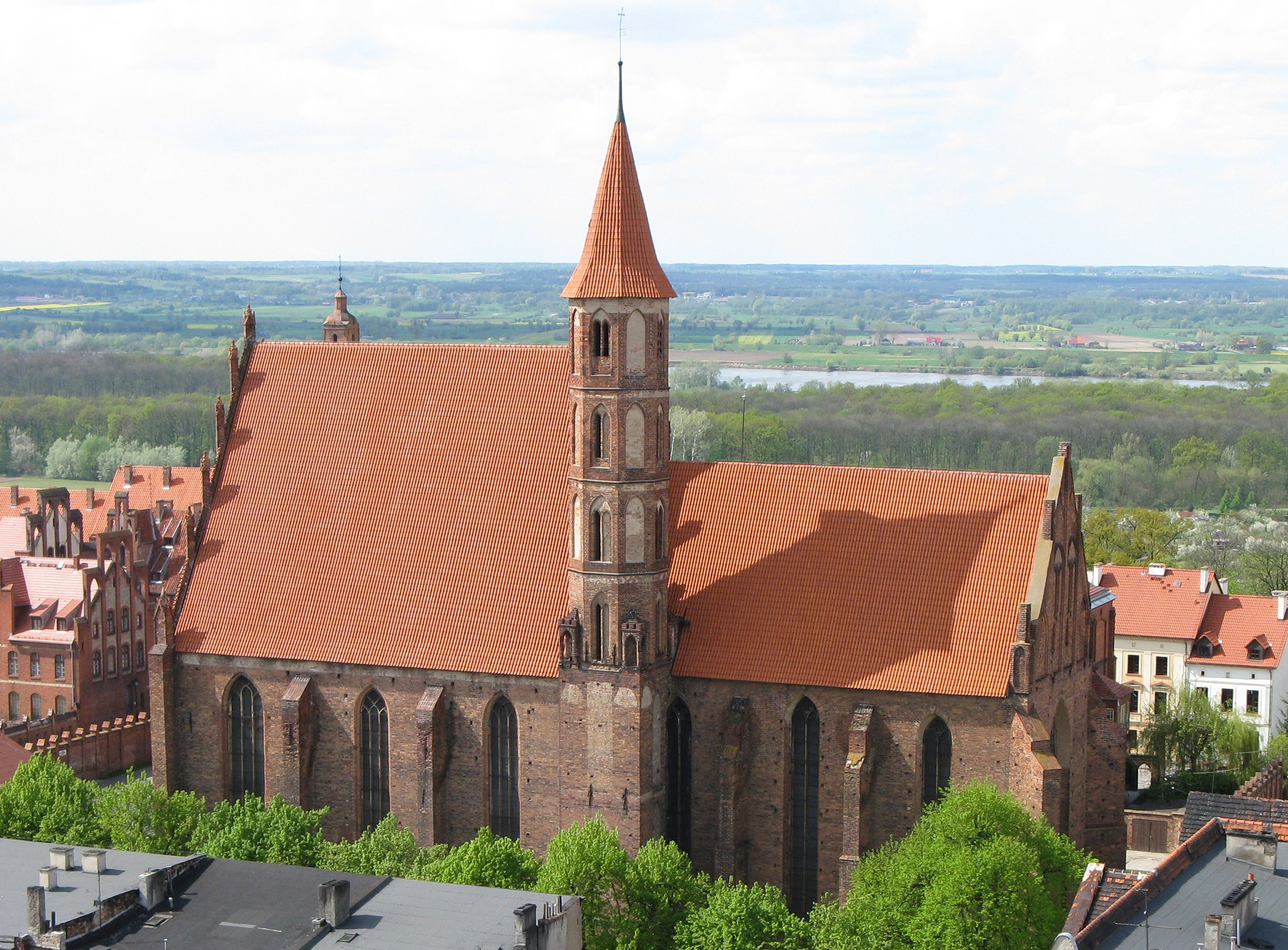
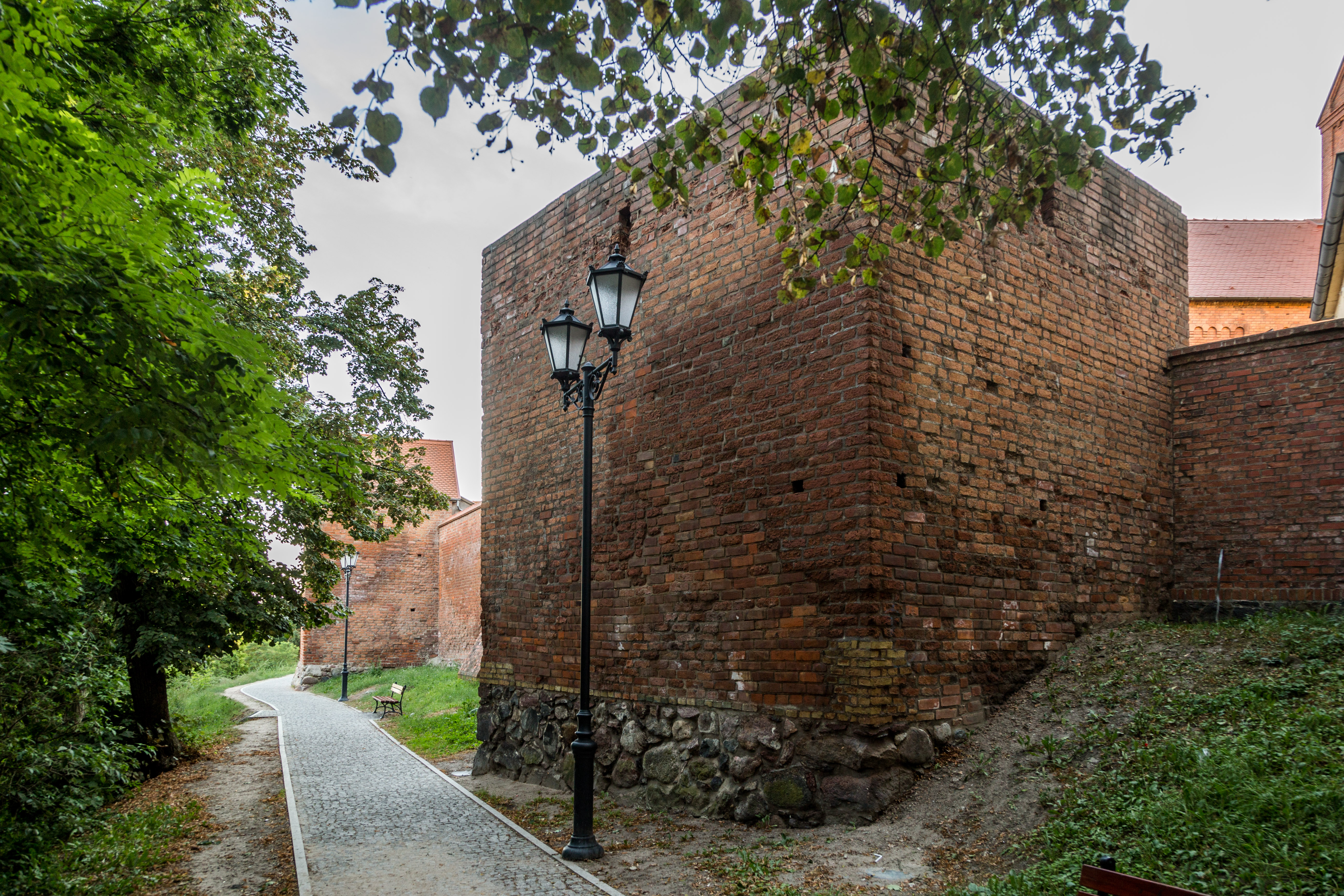
- Chełmno market square Saints James and Nicholas church Defensive walls

- Location within Poland
- Coordinates: 53°20′57″N 18°25′23″E
- Country: Poland
- Voivodeship: Kuyavian-Pomeranian
- County: Chełmno
- Gmina: Chełmno (urban gmina)

Area
  - Total: 13.56 km^{2} (5.24 sq mi)
- Elevation: 75 m (246 ft)

Population (31 December 2021)
  - Total: 18,915
  - Density: 1,395/km^{2} (3,613/sq mi)
- Time zone: UTC+1 (CET)
  - Summer (DST): UTC+2 (CEST)
- Postal code: 62-660
- Area code: +48 56
- Vehicle registration: CCH
- Website: https://chelmno.pl/pl/

Historic Monument of Poland
- Designated: 2005-04-13
- Reference no.: Dz. U. z 2005 r. Nr 64, poz. 568

Chełmno (Polish pronunciation: [ˈxɛu̯mnɔ]), historically known as Culm in both German and English (Modern German: Kulm), is a town in northern Poland near the Vistula river with 18,915 inhabitants as of December 2021. It is the seat of the Chełmno County in the Kuyavian-Pomeranian Voivodeship.

Due to its regional importance in the Middle Ages, the town gave its name to the entire area, Chełmno Land (and later an administrative unit of the Kingdom of Poland, the Chełmno Voivodeship), the local Catholic diocese and Kulm law, a municipal form of government for over 180 cities and towns in Central Europe, most notably Warsaw, Gdańsk, Toruń, Königsberg, Olsztyn, Płock and Klaipėda. It possesses a well-preserved historic Old Town, listed as a Historic Monument of Poland, with landmark Gothic churches and a Renaissance town hall. It was an important education center in the early modern period, and the place of pioneering surgical operations by renown Polish 19th-century surgeon Ludwik Rydygier.

== Name ==
The city's name Chełmno comes from chelm, the old Polish word for hill. After the area was granted to the Teutonic Knights as a Polish fief in 1232, the Germanized name Culm/Kulm was used in official documents regarding the town, as the city was a member of the Hanseatic League and part of the State of the Teutonic Order. Chełmno was annexed by Prussia in the First Partition of Poland in 1772 and, as part of a larger Germanization effort, it was officially renamed Kulm. During the German occupation in World War II, the town was again renamed from Chełmno to Kulm.

== History ==
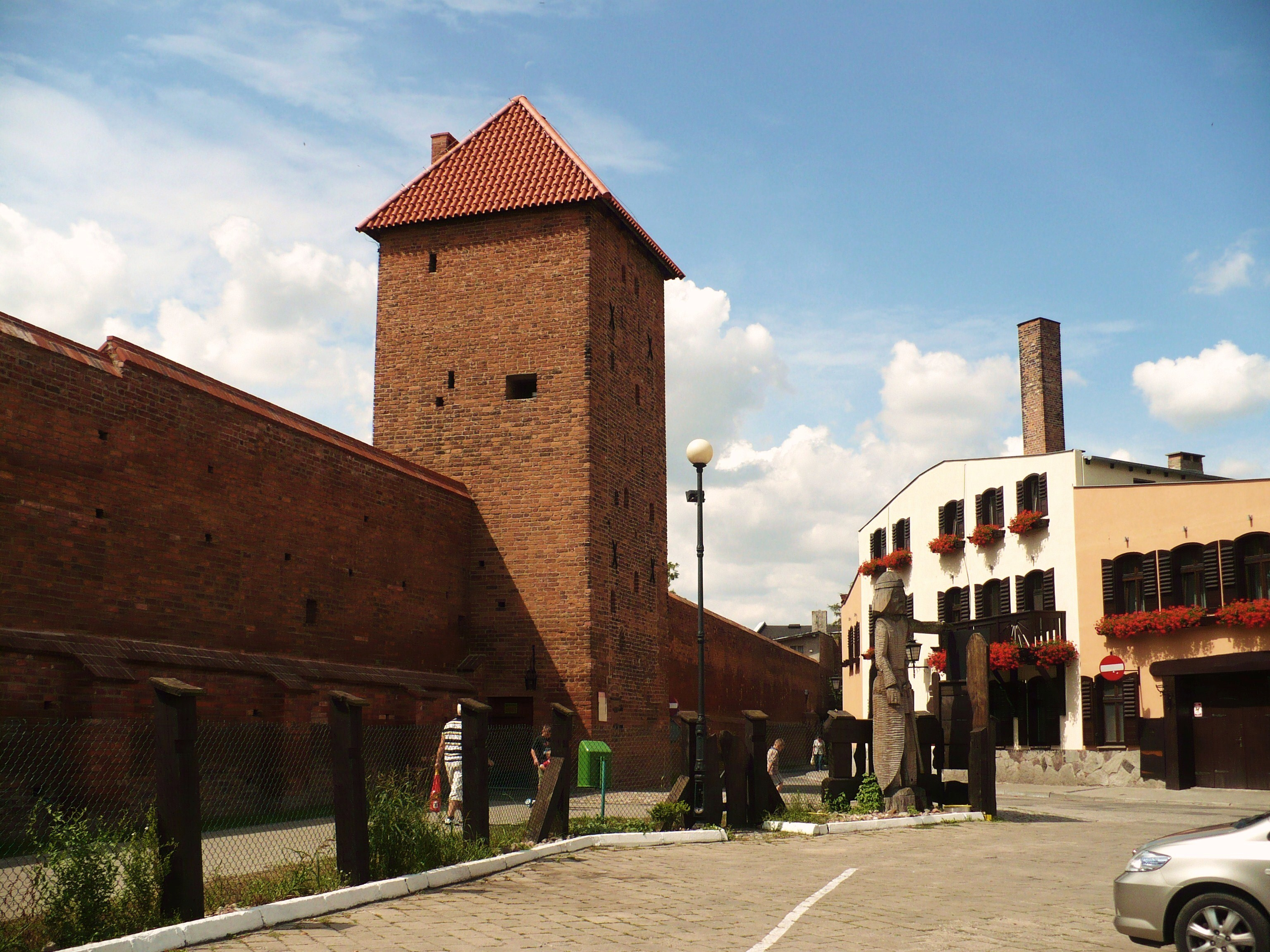
Medieval town walls with the Powder Tower

The first written mention of Chełmno is known from a document allegedly issued in 1065 by Duke Bolesław II the Generous of Poland for the Benedictine monastery in Mogilno. In 1226 Duke Konrad I of Masovia invited the Teutonic Knights to Chełmno Land. In 1233 Kulm was granted city rights known as "Kulm law" (renewed in 1251), the model system for over 200 currently Polish, Lithuanian and Russian towns. The town was made the nominal see of the Roman Catholic Diocese of Chełmno under the archbishop of Riga by the papal legate William of Modena in 1243 (however, the cathedral and the residence of the bishop were located actually in the adjacent Chełmża). The town grew prosperous as a member of the mercantile Hanseatic League.

In the 14th century, papal verdicts ordered the restoration of the town and region to Poland, however, the Teutonic Knights did not comply and continued to occupy it. The town remained part of the Teutonic Knights' state until 1454. In 1440, the town was one of the founding members of the Prussian Confederation, which opposed Teutonic rule, and upon the request of which King Casimir IV Jagiellon reincorporated the territory to the Kingdom of Poland in 1454. On 28 May 1454 the town pledged allegiance to the Polish King in Toruń. After the end of the Thirteen Years' War, the Teutonic Knights renounced claims to the town, and recognized it as part of Poland. It was made the capital of Chełmno Voivodeship. After dissolution of the Archdiocese of Riga in 1566, the bishops of Chełmno attended the councils of the ecclesiastical province of the metropolitan of Gniezno. This practice was recognised by the Holy See by the Bull De salute animarum in 1821, when Chełmno diocese became de jure a suffragan of the Archdiocese of Gniezno. Chełmno diocese was enlarged on that occasion (Górzno, Krajna and Działdowo). In 1692, the local gymnasium was transformed into the Chełmno Academy (Akademia Chełmińska), which in 1756 became a branch of the Jagiellonian University in Kraków, the oldest and leading Polish university. Grzegorz Gerwazy Gorczycki, one of the greatest Polish Baroque composers, was a lecturer at the Academy in the 1690s.

In 1772, following the First Partition of Poland, the town was annexed by the Kingdom of Prussia. Between 1807 and 1815 Chełmno was part of the short-lived Polish Duchy of Warsaw, being re-annexed by Prussia at the end of the Napoleonic Wars.

As Kulm, it had been a garrison town. In 1776 Frederick the Great founded here a cadet school which was to serve in Germanising Polish areas and nobility. In 1890 the garrison included 561 military staff. On 1 October 1890 the cadet school was moved to Koszalin (then Köslin) in Pomerania. Also as part of anti-Polish policies, the Prussians expelled the Kraków professors from Chełmno, abolished the local Polish academy, and closed down Catholic monasteries. Poles were subjected to various repressions, local Polish newspapers were confiscated.

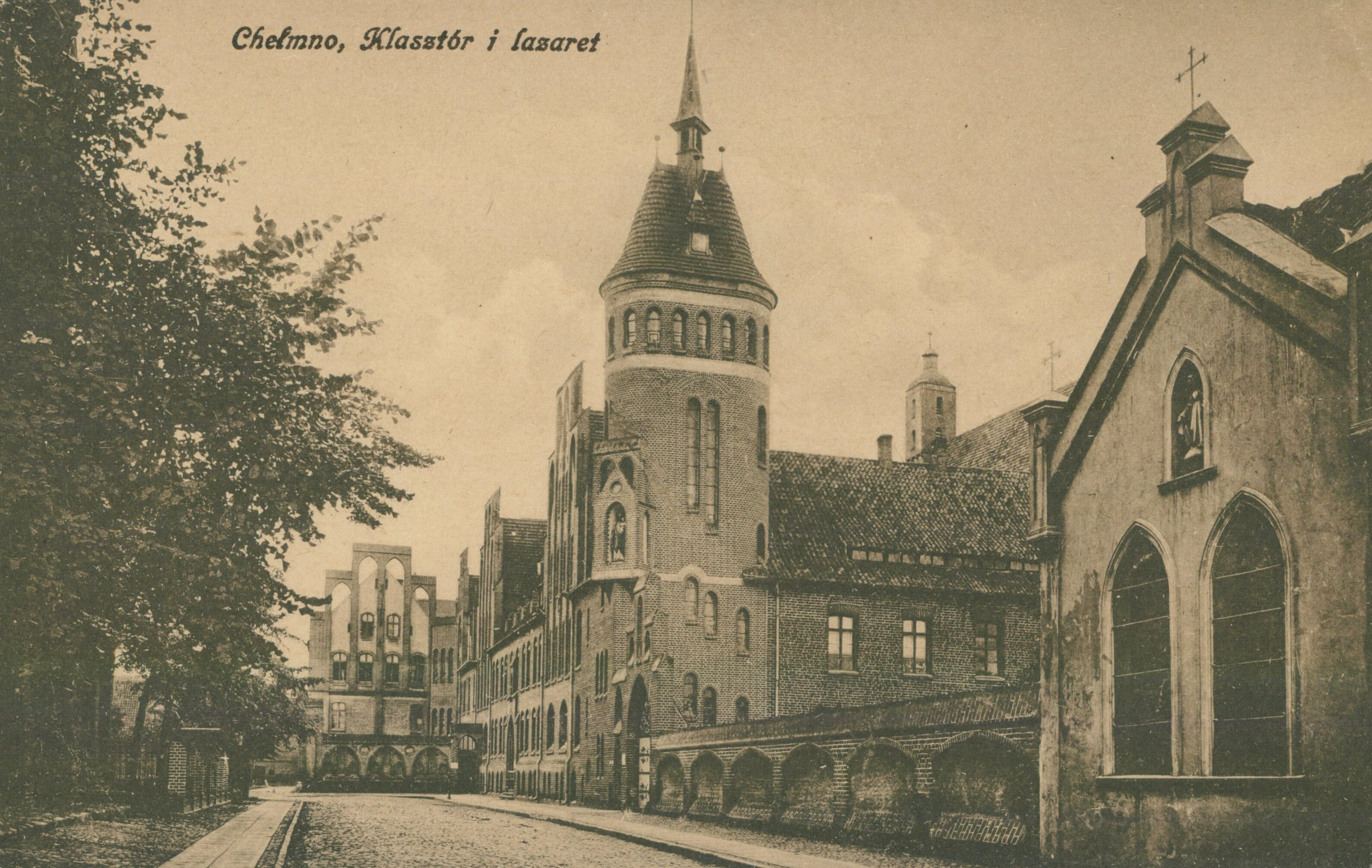
Convent of the Sisters of Charity in the interbellum

Renown Polish surgeon Ludwik Rydygier opened his private clinic in the town in 1878, where he conducted pioneering surgical operations, including the first in Poland and second in the world surgical removal of the pylorus in a patient suffering from stomach cancer in 1880 and the first in the world peptic ulcer resection in 1881. Rydygier sold the clinic to one of his employees, Leon Polewski, in 1887, due to harassment from the Prussian authorities.

On 22 January 1920 Polish troops were greeted by a large crowd of residents and Chełmno was reintegrated with Poland, which regained independence after World War I.

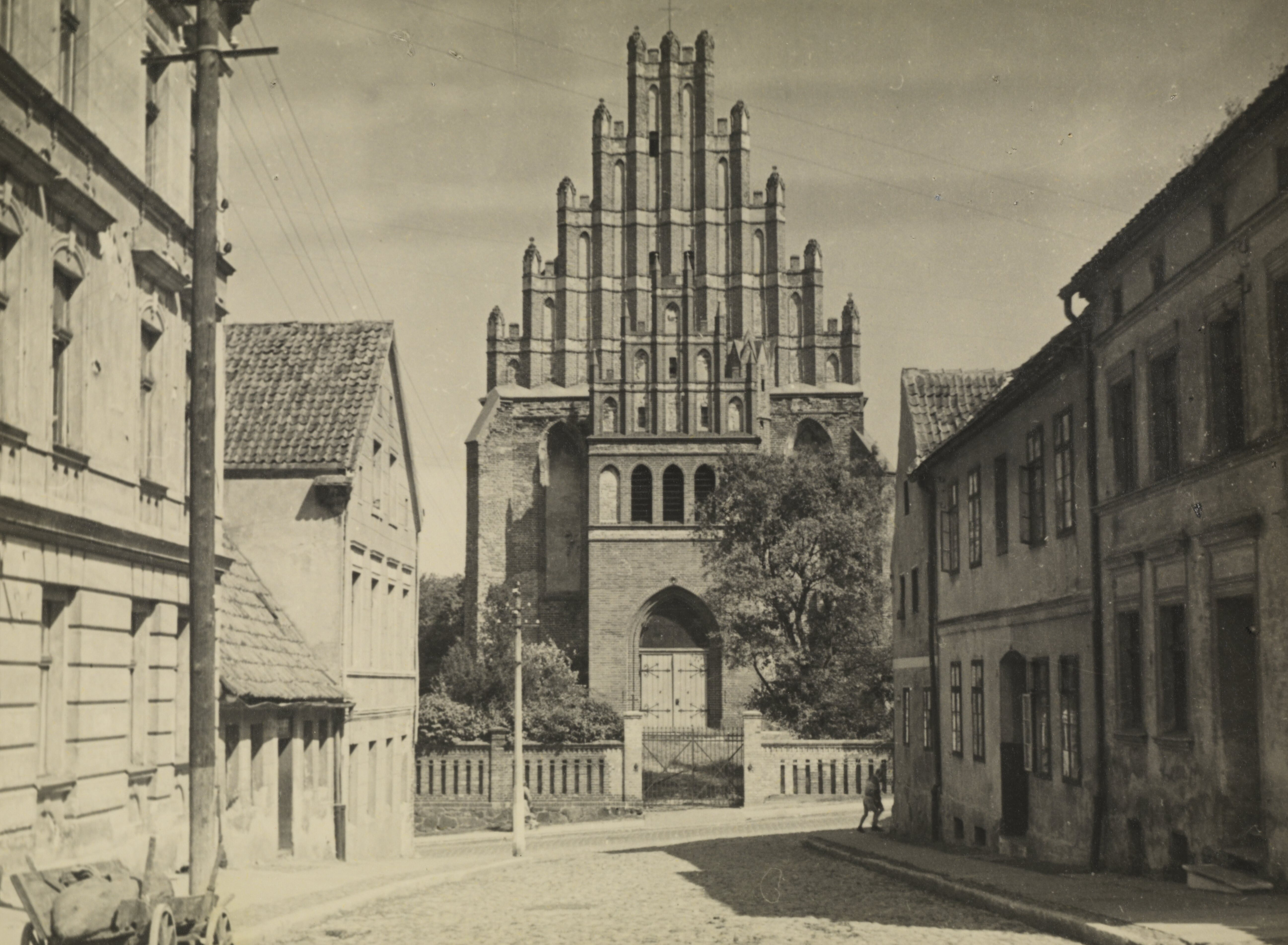
Dominican Church in 1945

When World War II broke out in 1939, Nazi German authorities murdered 5,000 Polish civilians upon taking control of the territory. The atrocities took place in Klamry, Małe Czyste, Podwiesk, Płutowo, Dąbrowa Chełmińska, and Wielkie Łunawy, while many other Poles were executed in forests. A number of Chelmno citizens are interviewed about these events in the documentary film Shoah (1985). The rest of the Polish population was expelled to the General Government in the more eastern part of German-occupied Poland in line with the German policy of Lebensraum. Polish Secret State resistance groups such as Polska Żyje ("Poland Lives"), Rota, Grunwald, and Szare Szeregi were also active in the area. The area was administered as part of Reichsgau Danzig-West Prussia and served as the seat of the district/county (kreis) of Kulm. On 25 January 1945 German forces set fire to several buildings in the city, including a hospital, a railway terminal, and a brewery, while retreating (see scorched earth).

The town was administratively part of the Toruń Voivodeship from 1975 to 1998.

== Demographics ==
Since its founding, the city had a mixed population of Poles and Germans, with the former making up two-thirds of its population in the second half of the 19th century.

Historical population

Year	Pop.	±%
1843	6,558	—
1871	8,477	+29.3%
1880	9,937	+17.2%
1890	9,762	−1.8%
1900	11,079	+13.5%
1910	11,718	+5.8%

Year	Pop.	±%
1921	10,208	−12.9%
1931	12,351	+21.0%
1939	13,452	+8.9%
1950	12,449	−7.5%
1960	15,989	+28.4%
1969	18,000	+12.6%

Year	Pop.	±%
1995	22,039	+22.4%
2000	20,650	−6.3%
2010	20,975	+1.6%
2020	19,205	−8.4%

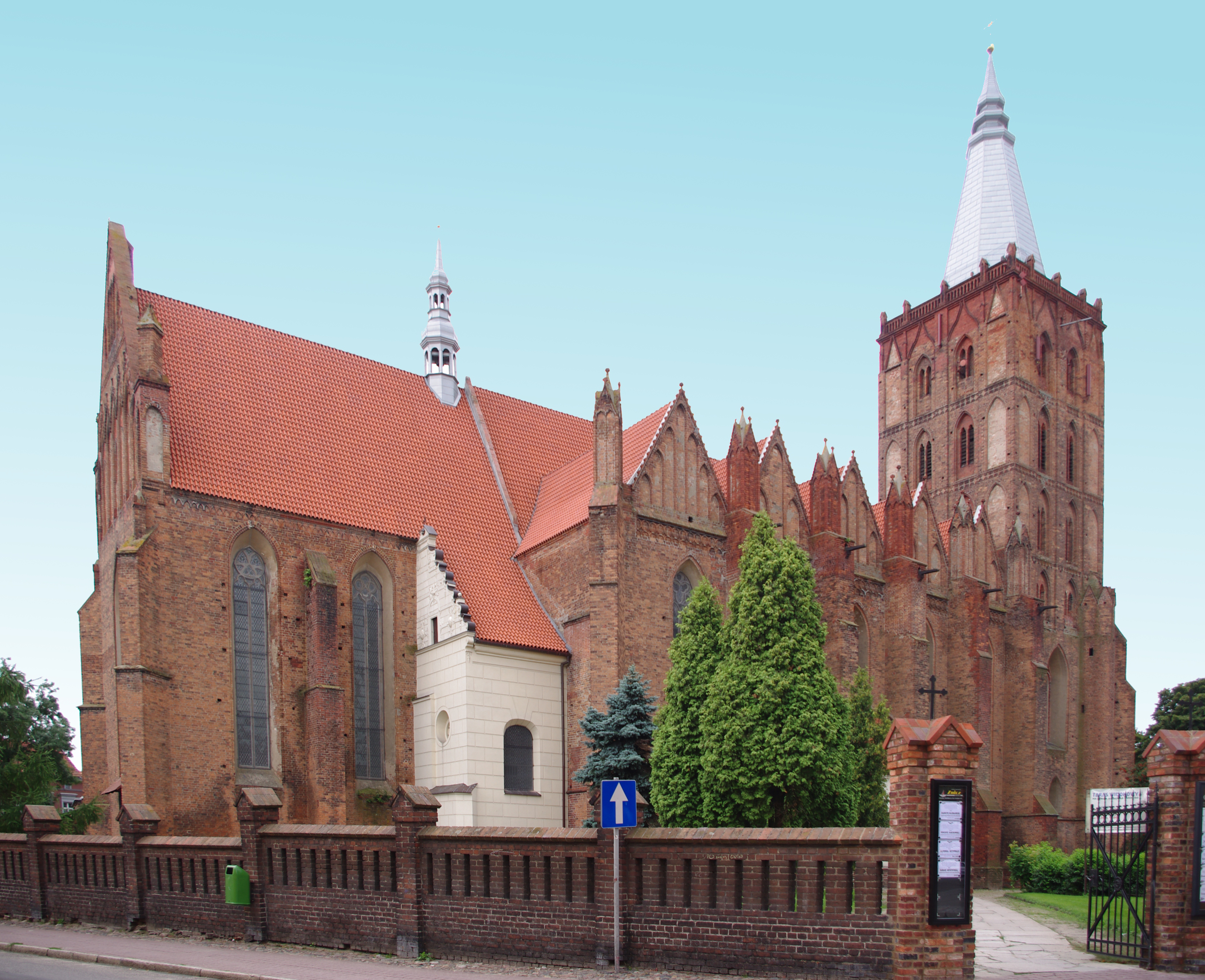
Church of the Assumption

== Main sights ==
Chełmno has a well-preserved medieval center, with five Gothic churches and a beautiful Renaissance town hall in the middle of the market square.

The Old Town is one of Poland's official national Historic Monuments (Pomnik historii), as designated 20 April 2005, and tracked by the National Heritage Board of Poland.

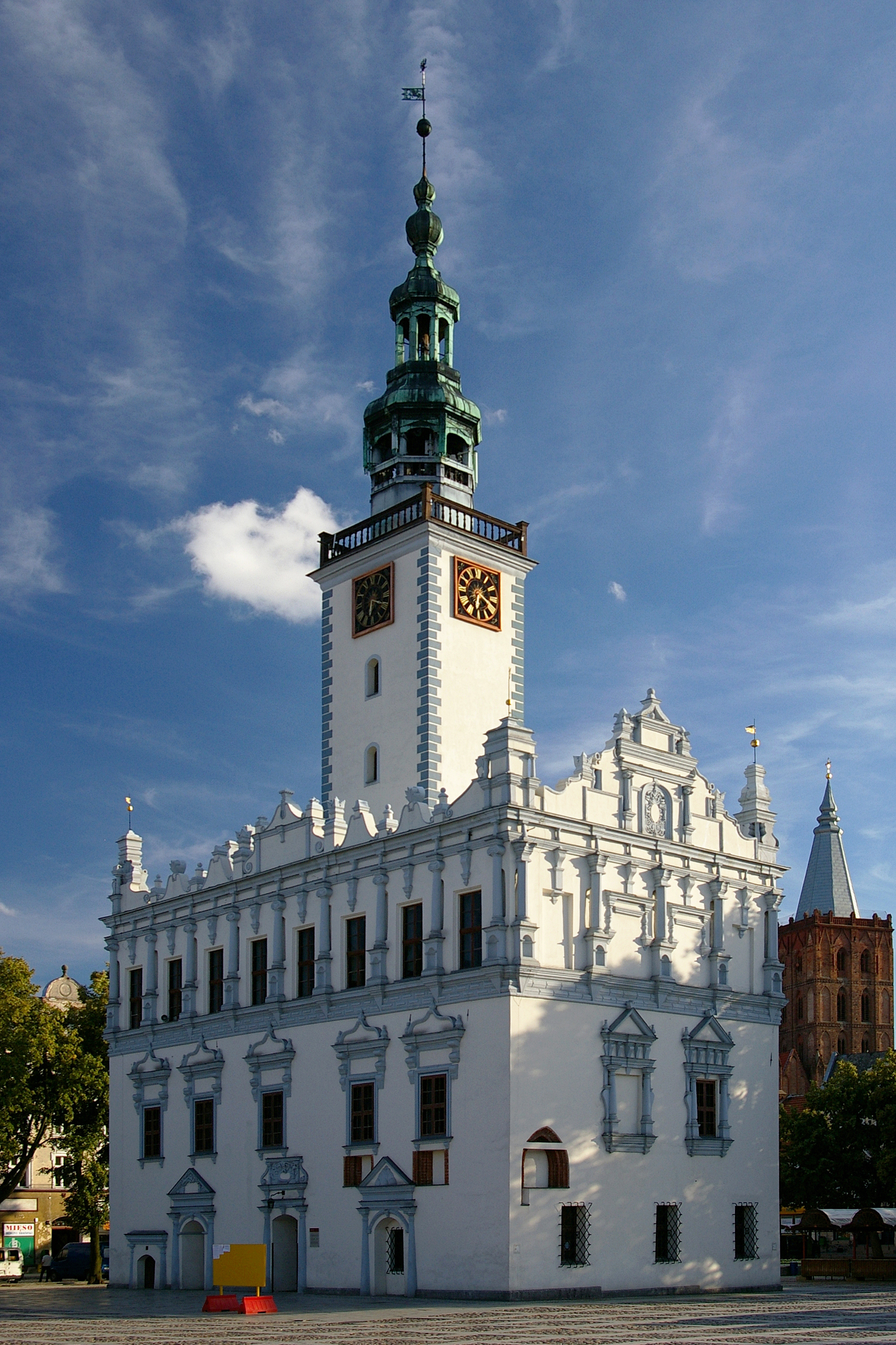
Town Hall

- Gothic churches:
  - Church of St Mary, former main parochial church of town, built 1280-1320 (with St. Valentine relic)
  - Church of Saints James and Nicholas, former Franciscan church, from the 14th century, rebuilt in the 19th century
  - Church of Saints Peter and Paul, former Dominican church, from the 13th and 14th centuries, rebuilt in the 18th and 19th centuries
  - Church of Saints John the Baptist and Johns the Evangelist, former Benedictine and Cistercian nuns' church, with monastery, built 1290-1330
  - Church of Holy Ghost, from 1280–90
- Town hall, whose oldest part comes from the end of the 13th century, rebuilt in manneristic style (under Italian influence) in 1567-1572
- City walls which surround whole city, preserved almost as a whole, with watch towers and Grudziądzka Gate
- Arsenal building constructed in 1811, now the seat of public library in Chełmno
- Baroque building of the Chełmno Academy, reconstructed in the 19th century
- Park Planty
- Monument of Ludwik Rydygier

Chełmno gives its name to the protected area called Chełmno Landscape Park, which stretches along the right bank of the Vistula.

== Notable residents ==
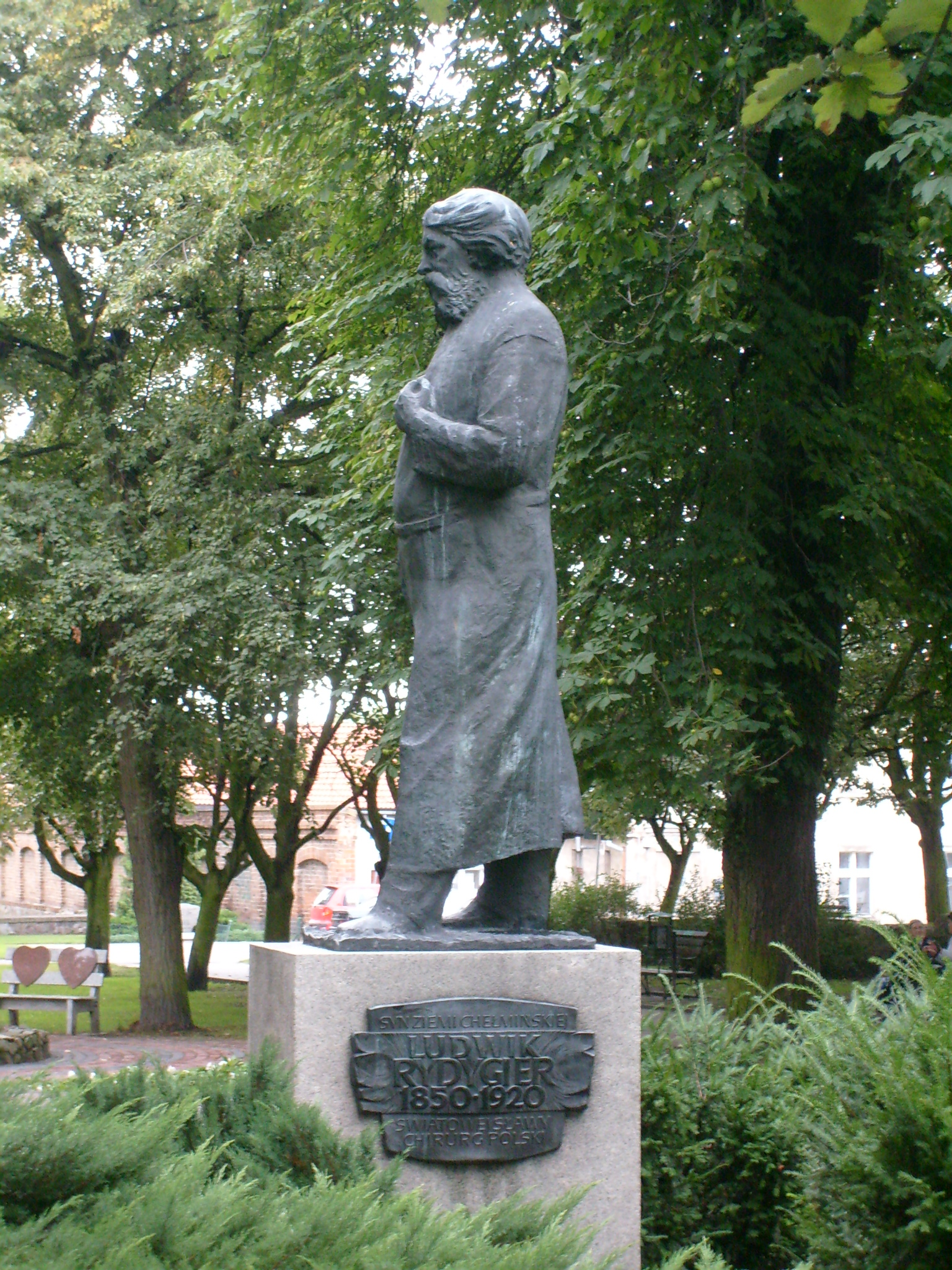
Statue of Ludwik Rydygier in Chełmno, the first surgeon in the world to carry out a peptic ulcer resection.

- Brunon Bendig (1938–2006), amateur boxer
- Adam Cieśliński (born 1982), footballer
- Friedrich-Carl Cranz (1886–1941), general
- Hans Dominik (1870–1910), colonial officer
- Roderich von Erckert (1821-1900), ethnographer
- Friedrich Fülleborn (1866–1933), physician and tropical disease specialist
- Grzegorz Gerwazy Gorczycki (ca. 1665–1734), Polish Baroque composer, lecturer at the Chełmno Academy
- Antoni Grabowski (1857–1921), chemical engineer, Esperanto activist
- Heinz Guderian (1888–1954), German general, blitzkrieg and tank theorist
- Hyacinth (Jacek) Gulski (1847-1911), Roman Catholic Priest, leader of the Polish Diaspora in the United States, particularly in Milwaukee
- Wojciech Stanisław Leski (1702–1758), Bishop of Chelmno
- Hermann Löns (1866–1914), writer
- Grzegorz Mielcarski, (born 1971), former professional footballer
- Dariusz Mioduski (born 1964), entrepreneur, lawyer, owner of Legia Warsaw
- Michael Otto (born 1943), entrepreneur
- Franciszek Raszeja (1896–1942), doctor
- Leon Raszeja (1901–1939), lawyer
- Ludwik Rydygier (1850–1920), renown surgeon and professor of medicine
- Walter Schilling (1895–1943), Wehrmacht general
- Kurt Schumacher (1895–1952), German politician
- Max Sperling (1905–1984), Wehrmacht officer
- Max Stirner (1806–1856), philosopher
- Adolf Wach (1843–1926), German jurist
- Jakub Zabłocki (1984–2015), footballer

== Gallery ==
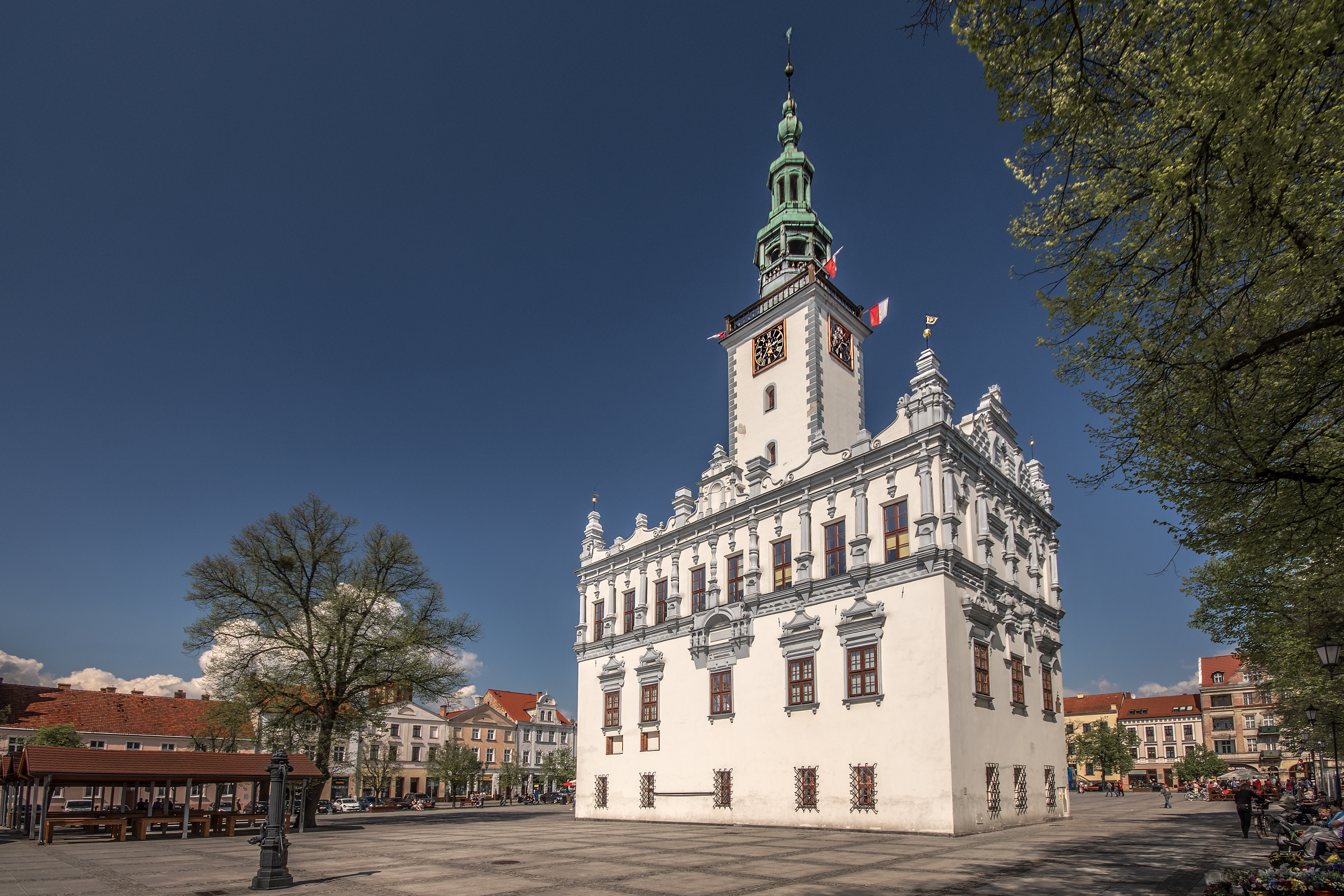
Chełmno Market Square

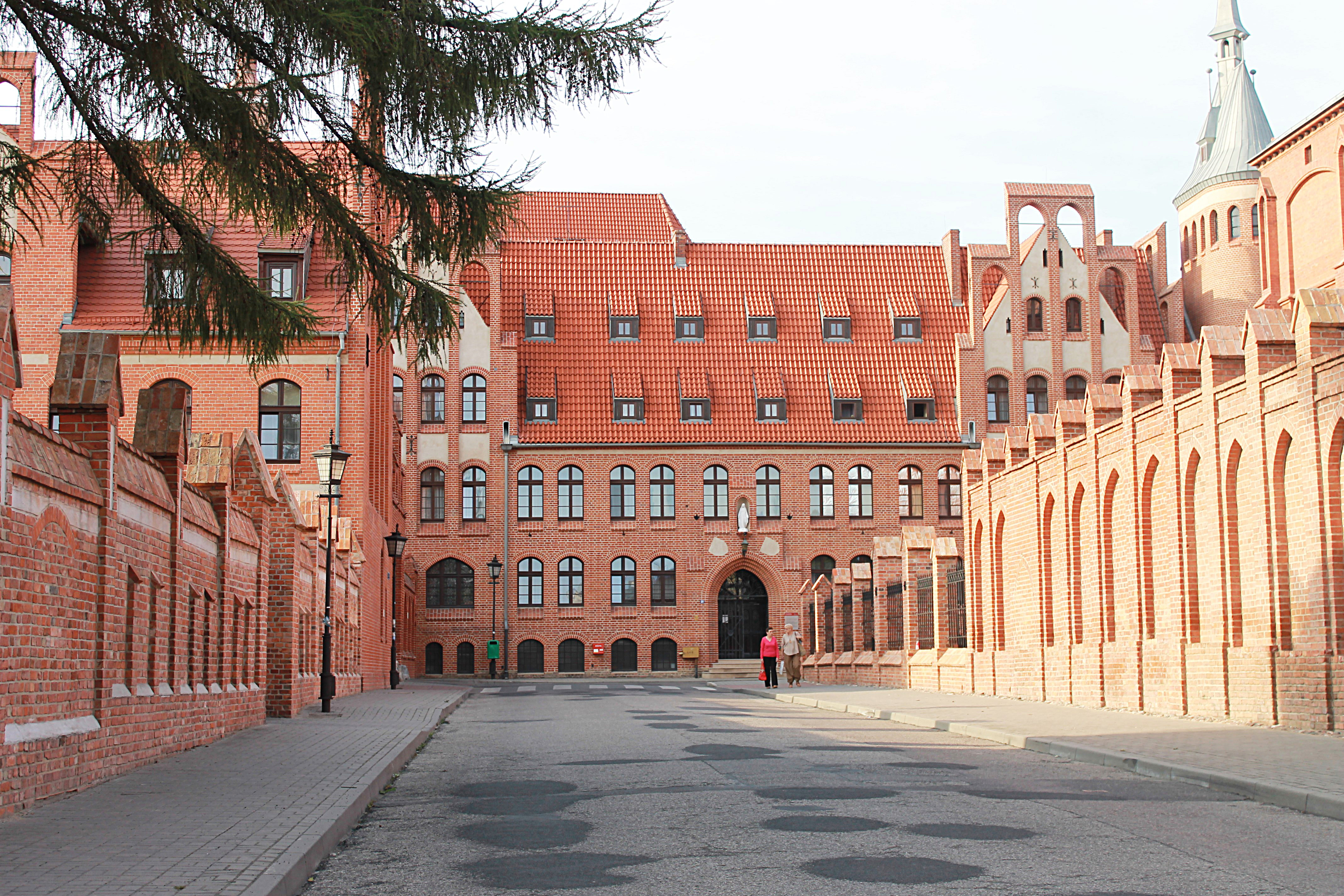
Convent of the Sisters of Charity

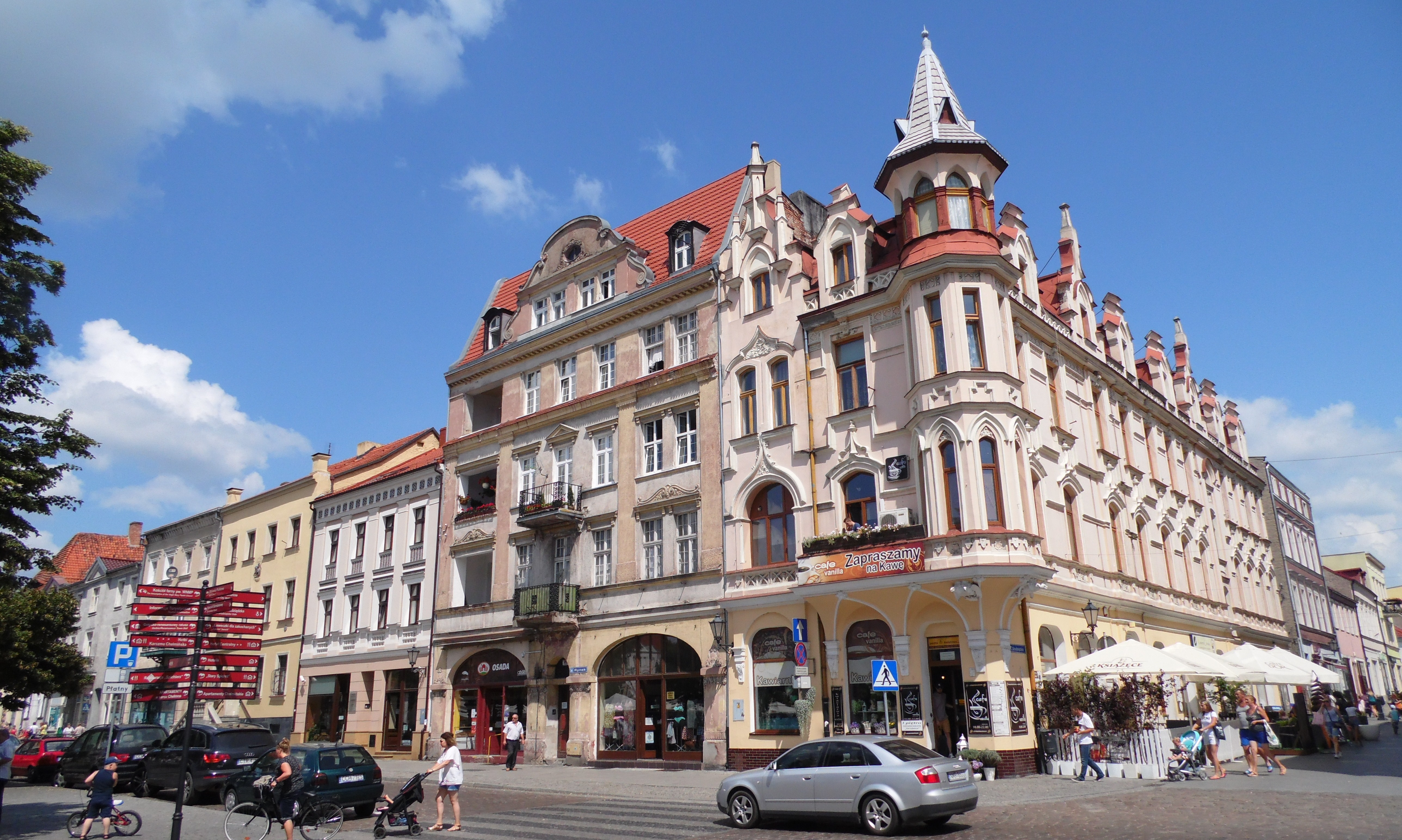
Historic townhouses at the Market Square

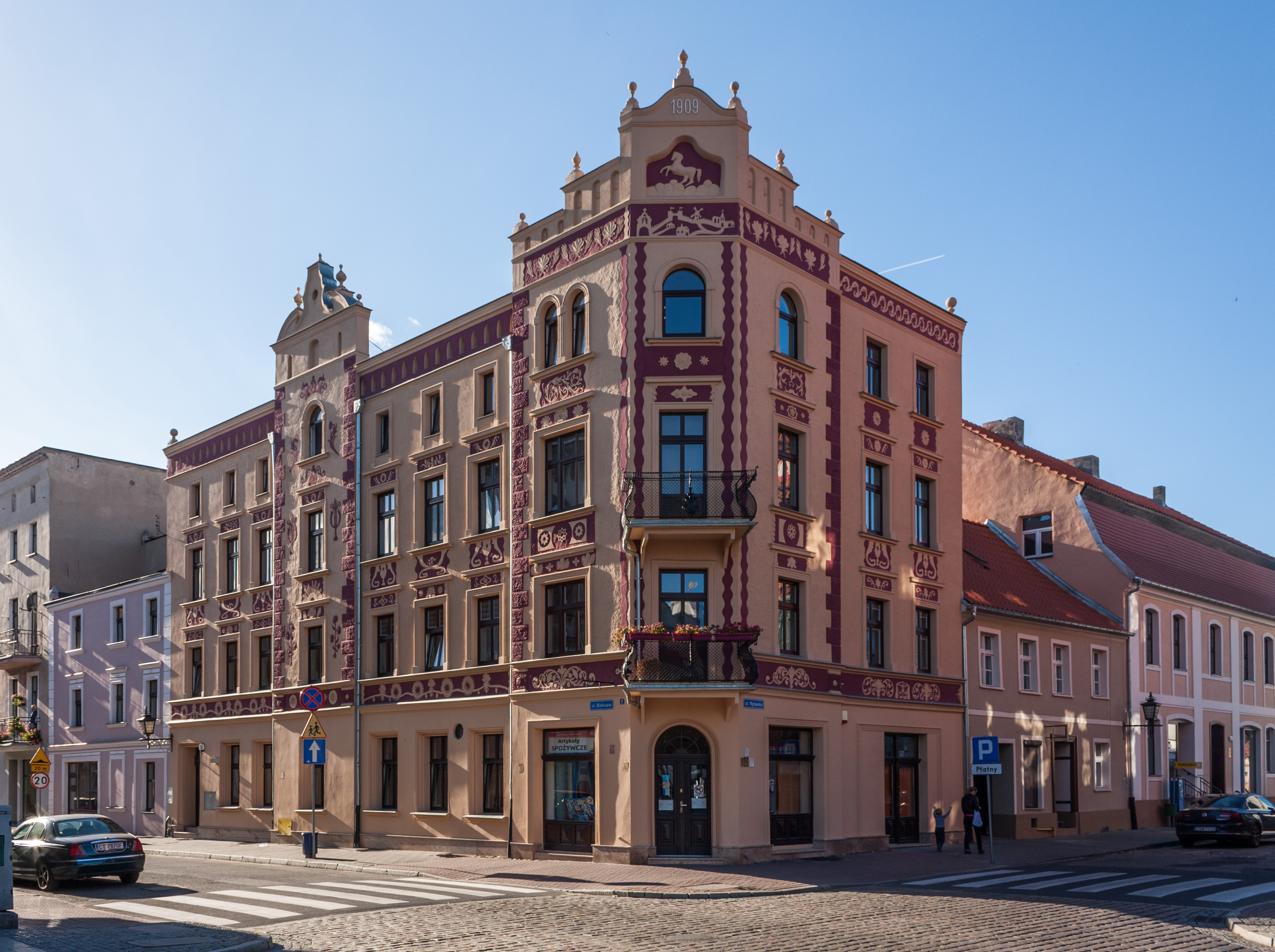
Historic townhouses in the Old Town

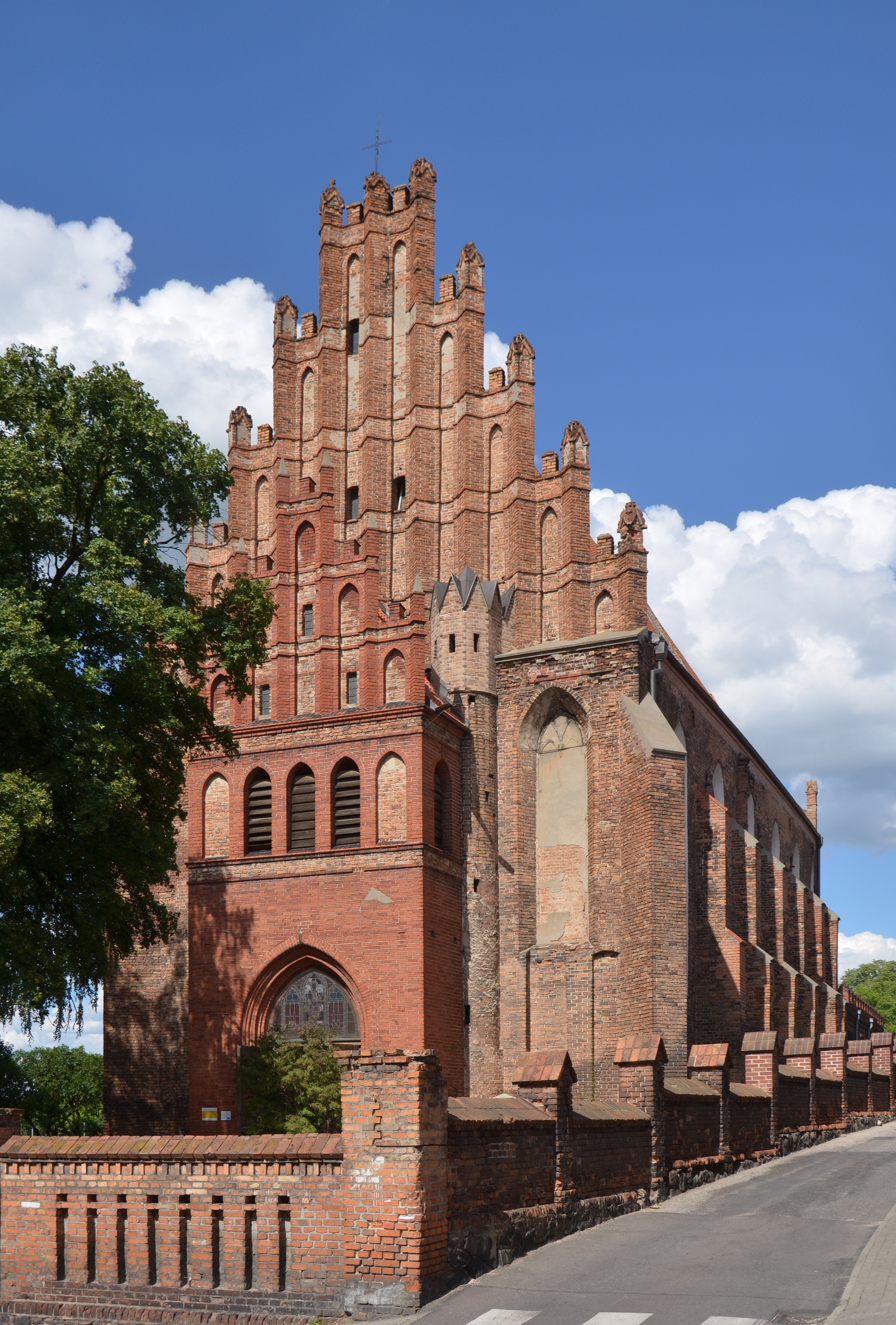
Saints Peter and Paul church

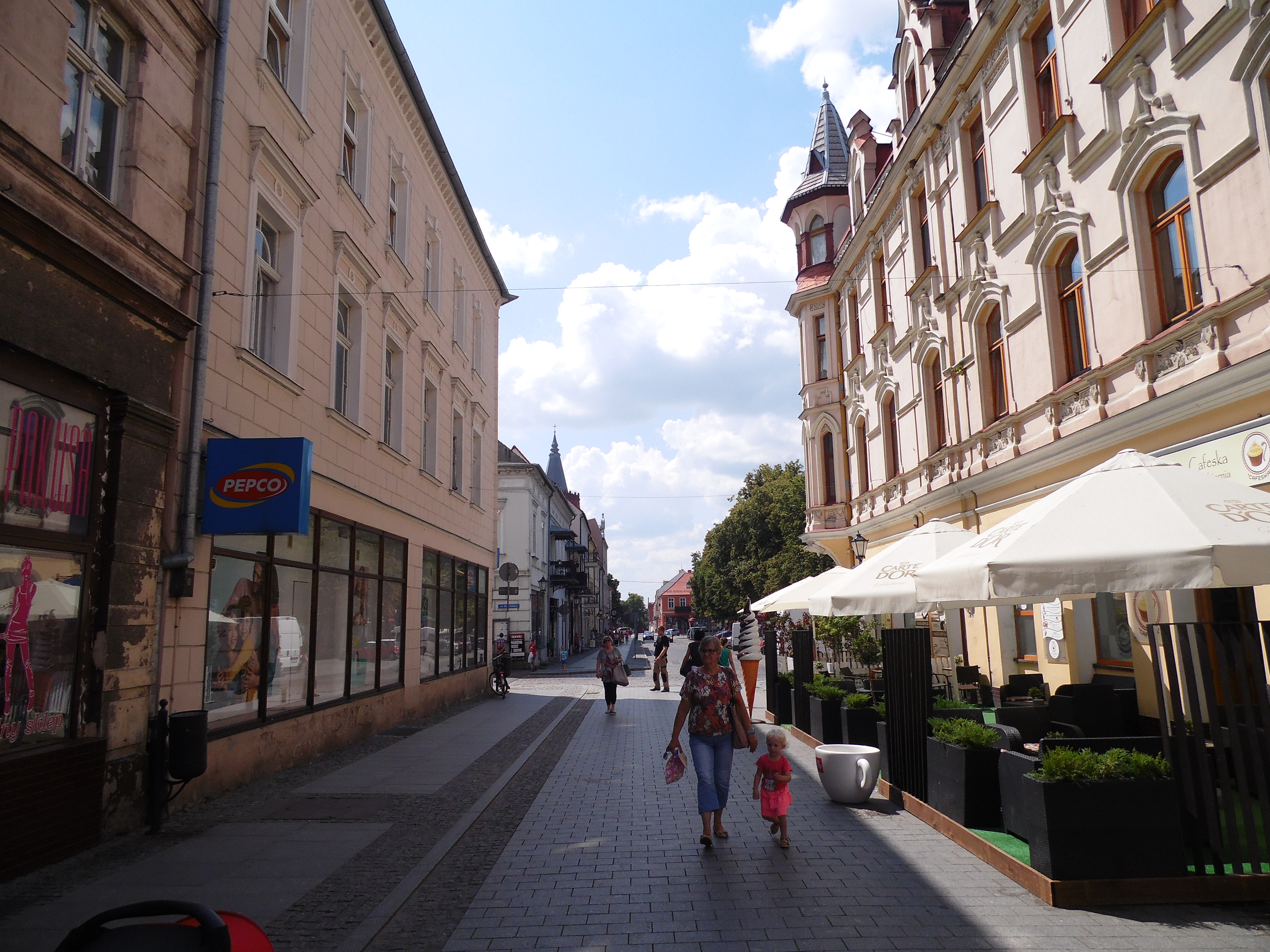
Grudziądzka Street in the Old Town

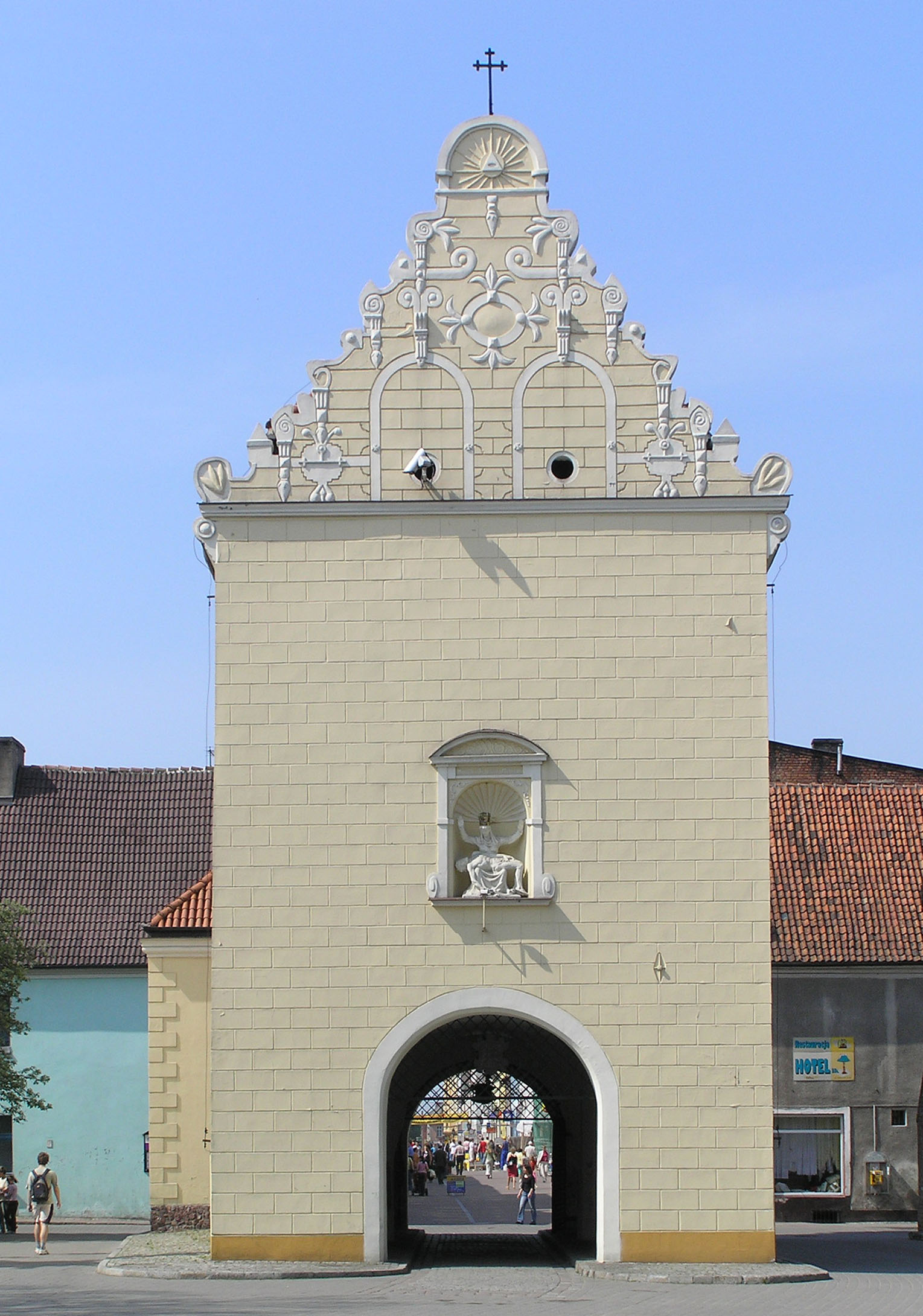
Grudziądzka Gate

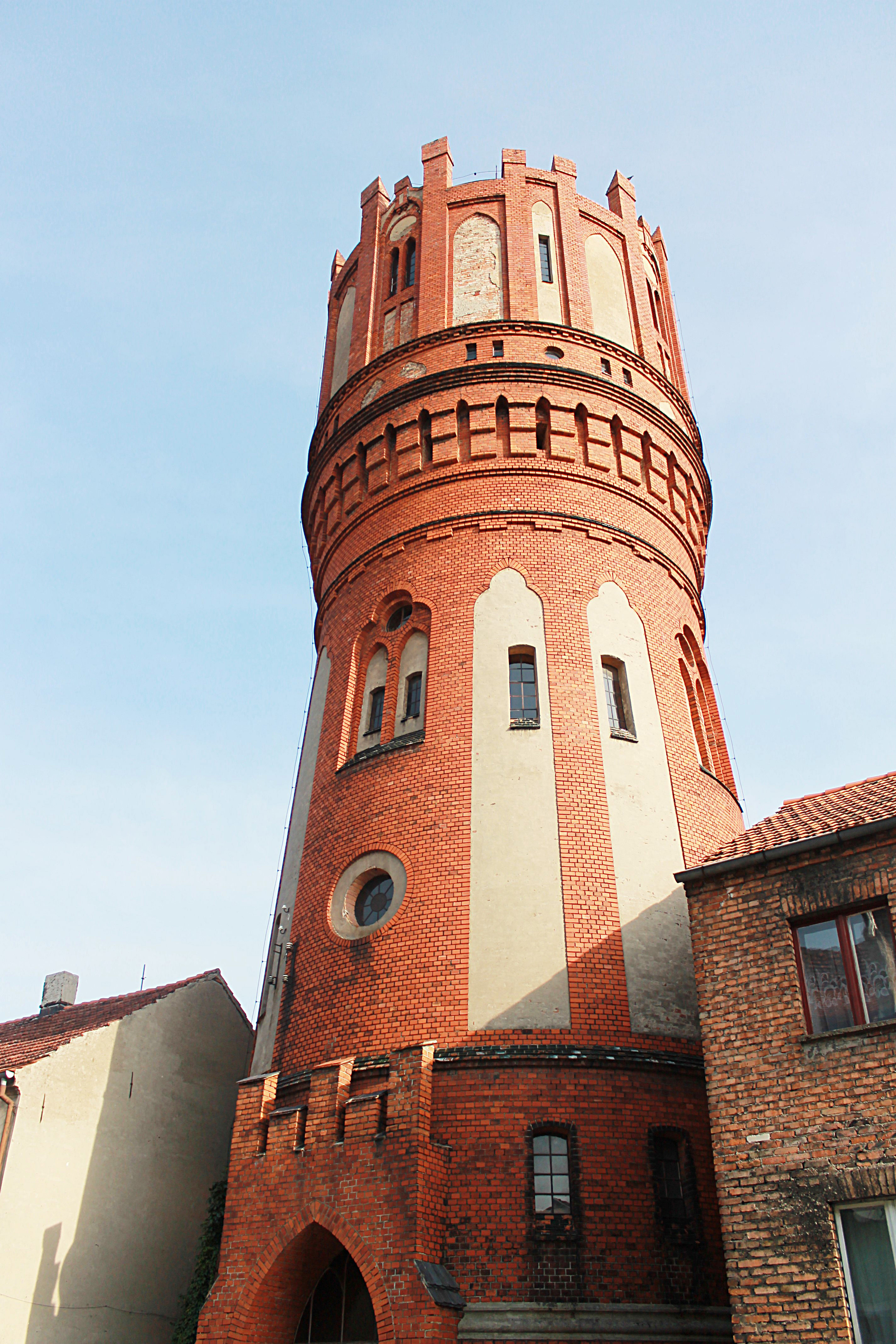
Water tower

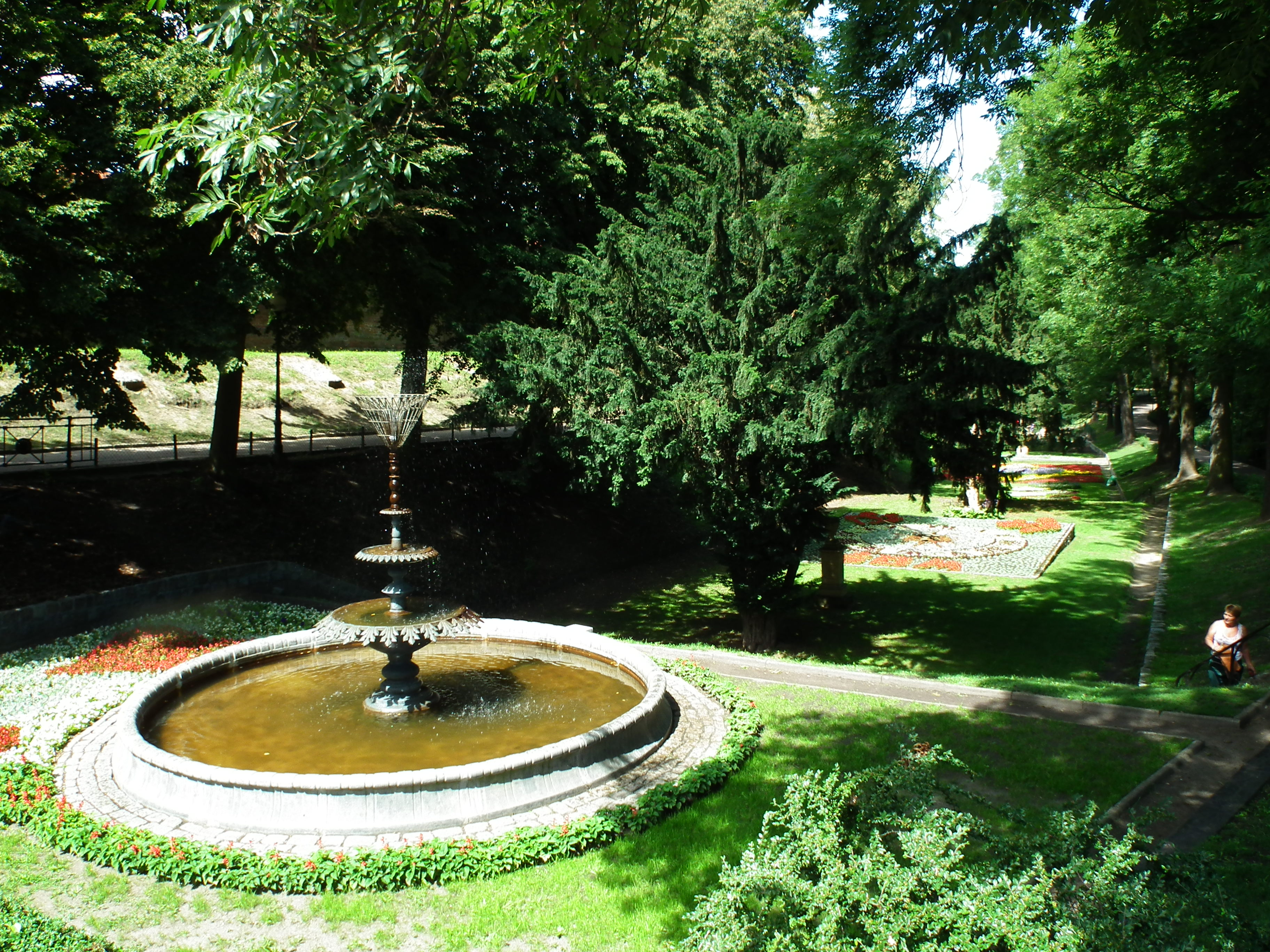
Planty Park

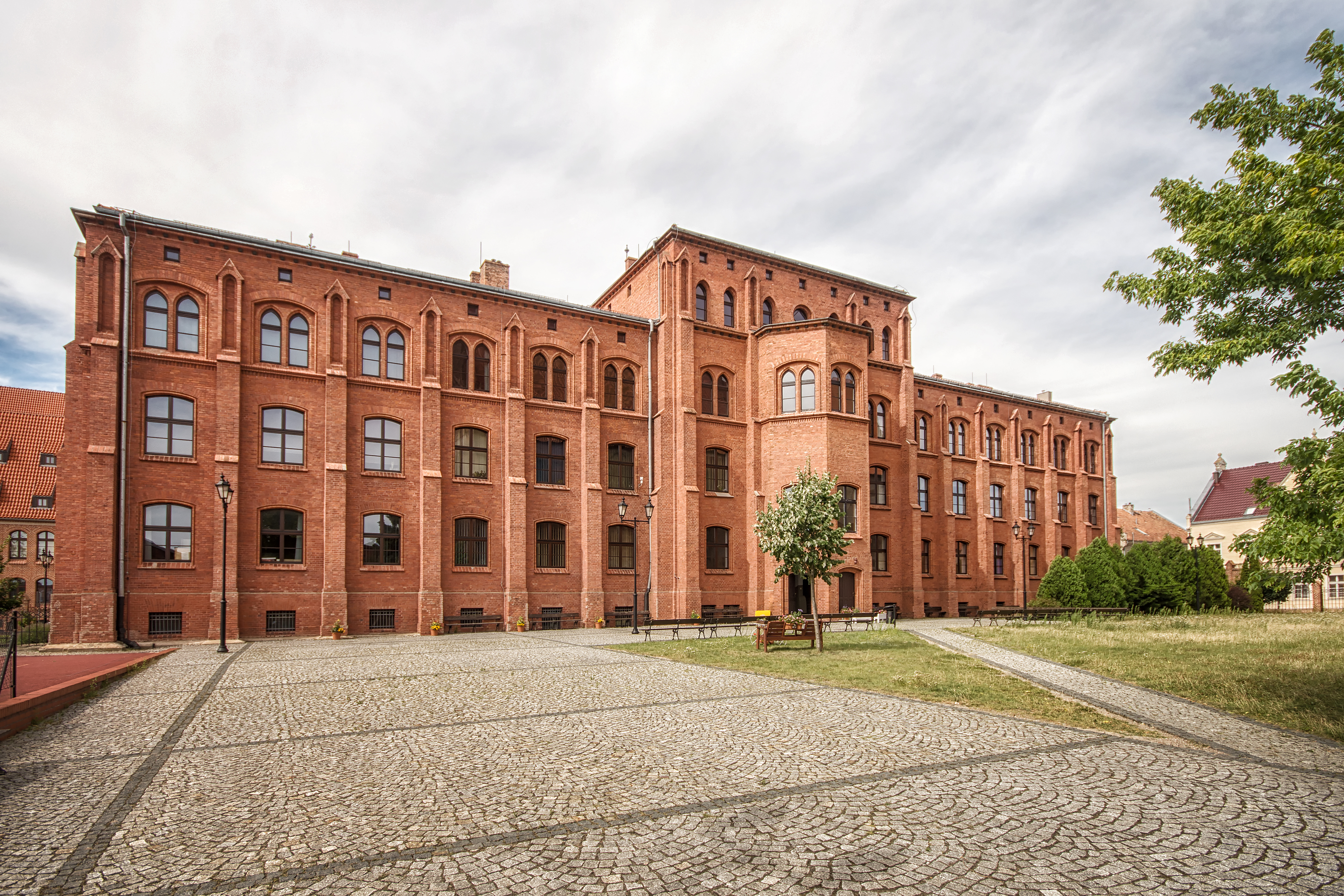
High school

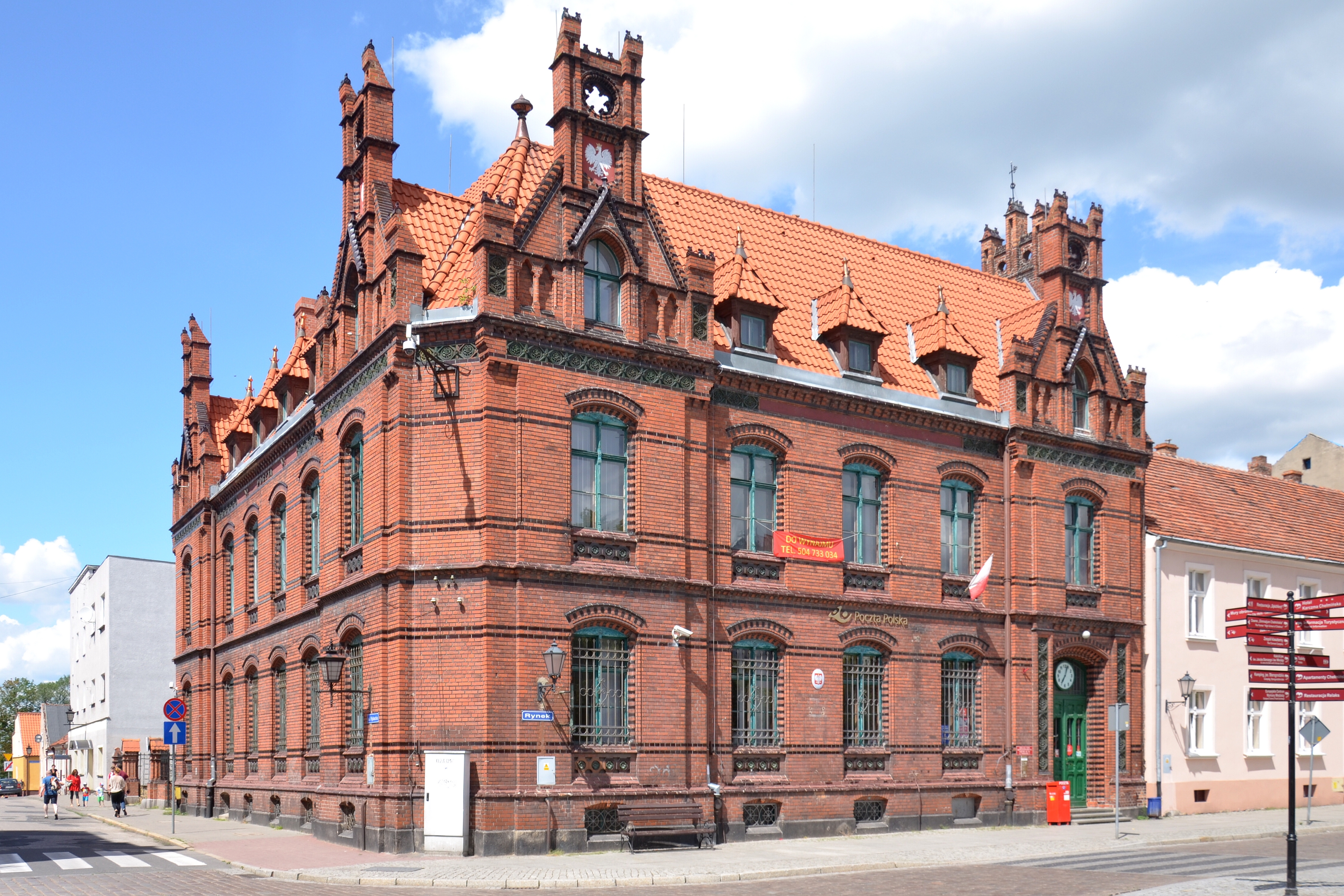
Post office

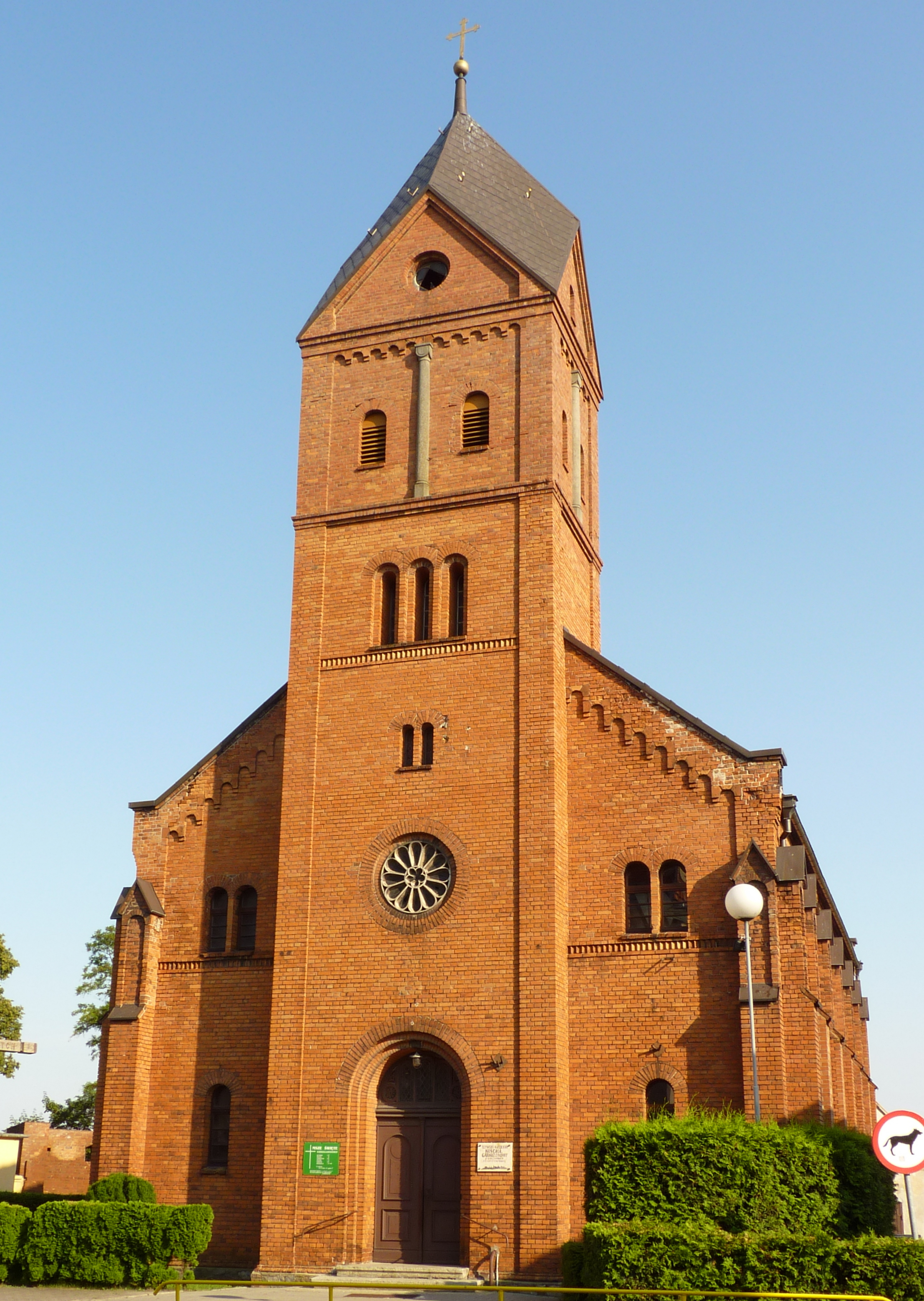
Garrison Church of Our Lady of Częstochowa

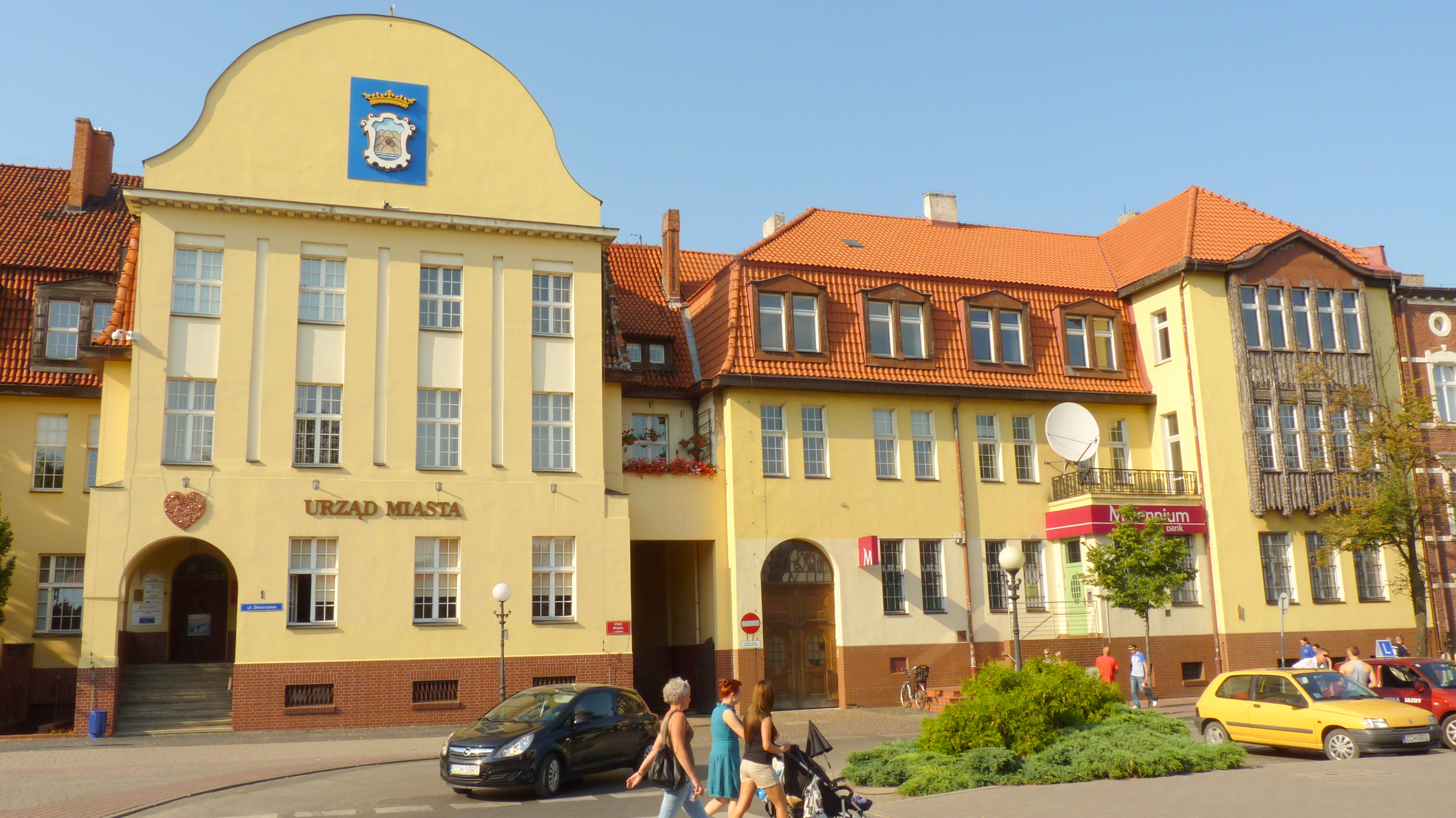
Municipal office

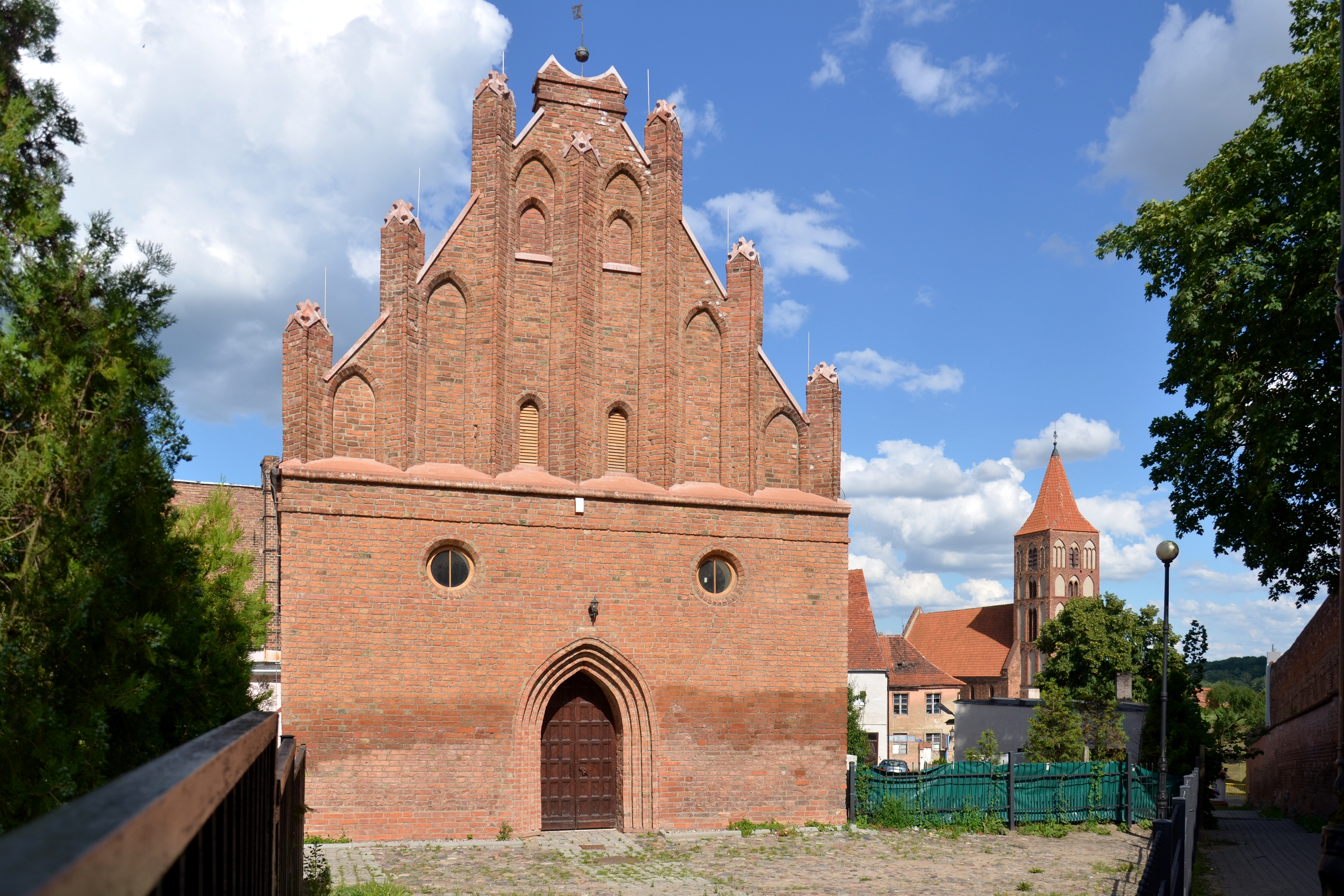
Saint Martin chapel

== See also ==
- List of cities and towns in Poland
