= Abe Gutnajer =

Polish Jewish art dealer died in Holocaust (1888–1942)

Abe Gutnajer

Abe Gutnajer (born ca. 1888, died 21 July 1942 in Warsaw), or Abel Gutnajer, was a Polish art dealer of Jewish descent and one of the greatest antiquarians of the Second Republic of Poland, organizer of auctions and exhibitions of Polish paintings.

== 1915-1939 ==
Abe Gutnajer came from a family of Warsaw antiquarians, who had small antiquarian bookshops in Śliska and Bagno Streets, catering mainly to Jewish customers. Around 1915, Abe Gutnajer opened his antique shop at 35 Świętojańska Street, where he also organised exhibitions of paintings, including Wojciech Kossak's in 1915, Władysław Czachórski's and Józef Brandt's in 1916, as well as Julian Fałat's, Jacek Malczewski's, Józef Mehoffer's, Henryk Siemiradzki's and Jan Matejko's, and again Wojciech Kossak's in 1917. In his antique shop, he also organised auctions of paintings, which was a rare practice in Warsaw at that time.

Gutnajer traveled across Europe, bringing back to Poland paintings by leading Polish artists scattered around the world. He acquired works by Olga Boznańska and Józef Chełmoński, from Vienna works by Józef Brandt, Aleksander Gierymski, Leopold Löffler and Jan Matejko, and from Berlin paintings by Maksymilian Gierymski, rarely seen in Poland. Among paintings purchased by Gutnajer there were 14 canvases by Józef Chełmoński, purchased in Paris in 1918, and "Portrait of a Reading Man" by Pieter de Greberr (purchase from 1917).

In 1920, he moved his flagship representative antique shop to 16 Mazowiecka Street, and a second one, of a less prestigious rank, in which he sold less valuable paintings, furniture and artistic craft products, was located nearby, at 11 Mazowiecka Street. In 1924, he acquired a part of the Polish painting collection owned by Count Ignacy Korwin-Milewski. Among the canvases purchased at that time were "Babie Lato" by Józef Chełmoński (purchased in 1924 by the National Museum in Warsaw) and "Widok na zamek Kufstein" by Aleksander Gierymski, donated to the Museum in 1927.

He also organized exhibitions of his collection in other Polish cities. In 1936 and 1937 in Lodz he showed Rembrandt's Self-Portrait and the portrait of Primate Poniatowski by M. Bacciarelli.

One of the last major auctions of works of art conducted by his art salon and antique shop before the outbreak of war was the auction of the collection of Henryk Loewenfeld, owner of the manor area in Chrzanów in June 1939.

== Nazi persecution and World War II ==
During the September campaign, Gutnajer's antique shop and apartment at 16 Mazowiecka Street were destroyed in a bombardment. The antique shop at 11 Mazowiecka Street remained intact. Opinions are divided as to the fate of his collection kept in his house. It is believed that it was probably not destroyed and was secured somewhere after the first bombardments of the capital. Before his displacement to the Warsaw ghetto, Gutnajer returned the items accepted for consignment sale before the outbreak of the war. What Abe Gutnajer took with him to the ghetto, except for the painting "Portrait of a Reading Man" by Peter de Greberr, is unknown. He probably deposited the rest of the collection with his friend, Edmund Mętlewicz, who, on his orders, sold the canvases in the Warsaw antique shops "Skarbiec" and "Miniatura", and transferred the money to the ghetto.

Abe Gutnajer lived there near the St. Karol Boromeusz church at 26 Chłodna Street and was murdered there by the Germans on 21 July 1942. He was killed on the eve of the destruction of the Warsaw Ghetto and the murder of its inmates. On the day of his death, he had an appointment for a medical consultation with the prominent Polish pathophysiologist and joint pathophysiologist Prof. Franciszek Raszeja, who had been granted a pass to the ghetto especially for that occasion. The antiquarian's apartment was inhabited, apart from him, by his wife Regina, daughter Stefania, son-in-law and granddaughter, several other family members, Professor Raszeja with his assistant Dr. Kazimierz Pollak and a Jewish nurse.

The circumstances of the crime are described by, among others, Dr. Zbigniew Lewicki, who, on the day after the tragedy, went to the ghetto to look for Prof. Raszeja after he had failed to return from his pass, and by Władysław Szpilman, who, in his memoirs published after the war, states that A. Gutnajer was shot under anesthesia on the operating table. According to Marek Edelman, this crime, as well as others carried out on 21 July 1942, were intended to intimidate the ghetto population so that it would not put up resistance during the displacement action planned for the following day.

The bodies of the victims of the murder on 26 Chlodna St. were quickly buried in a mass grave in the Jewish cemetery on Okopowa St. in Warsaw's Wola district.

== Postwar ==
Abe Gutnajer's son, Ludwik, survived the war. He fought in the September campaign against both the Germans and the Soviets, then as a soldier of the Independent Carpathian Rifle Brigade he participated in the Battle of Tobruk in 1941, and then as a bombardier he took part in RAF combat flights over Germany.

== Family ==
Abe Gutnajer's brothers also ran reputable antique shops in Warsaw and were regarded as well-known art collectors. Bernard Gutnajer ran an antique shop in the English Hotel at 6 Wierzbowa Street, while Józef had an antique shop on Zielna Street. In addition to hundreds of Polish paintings, Bernard Gutnajer owned many decorative art objects.

== Cultural influence ==
In his "Chronicles of the week", Antoni Słonimski used a word he created himself, "abergutnajerism", to describe his preoccupation with past times in reference to Abe Gutnajer's interest in 19th century painting.

== Restitution claims ==
In March 2006, Pieter de Grebber's "Portrait of a Reading Man," stolen from Gutnajer's apartment in the ghetto, was found in the registry and catalog entitled "Wartime Losses. Foreign Painting," published after the war by the Ministry of Culture and National Heritage. The exhibitor of the painting at Christie's auction house in London was an anonymous seller from Latvia. The painting was valued at 800-1,200 pounds at the time of the exhibition. The discovery that it is a Greberr painting was made by experts from the Art Lost Register. After negotiations led by professor Wojciech Kowalski, who is the Ministry of Foreign Affairs plenipotentiary for the Restitution of Plundered and Displaced Cultural Property, it was agreed that the profit from the sale of the painting would be divided equally between the Latvian seller and the heirs of Abe Gutnajer, his daughter-in-law Eve Gutnajer-Infanti and grandchildren Stefan and Krystyna. On 25 April 2008 the painting was sold for £46,100 to London dealer Johnny von Haeften.
