= Franciszek Paweł Raszeja =

Polish physician and university professor

- Born: 2 April 1896; Chełmno
- Died: 21 July 1942 (aged 46); Warsaw
- Cause of death: murdered
- Spouse: Stanisława Deniszczuk (1923)
- Children: Bożena; Ewa

Franciszek Paweł Raszeja (2 April 1896 in Chełmno – 21 July 1942 in Warsaw) was a Polish orthopaedic physician and academic teacher. The brother of activist Leon Raszeja, he was killed while visiting a Jewish patient in the Warsaw Ghetto during World War II.

== Biography ==
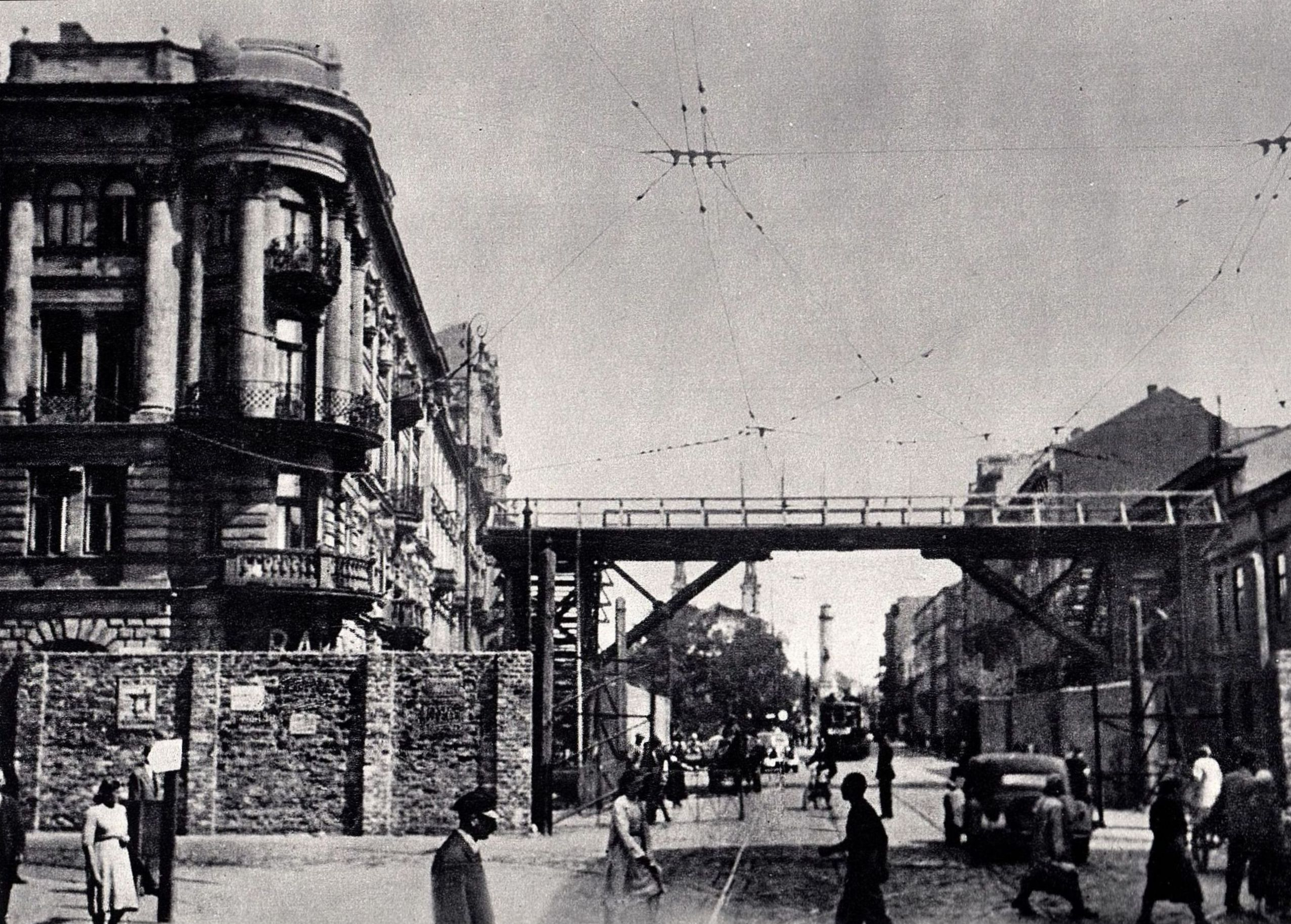
Tenement house at Chłodna Street 26 (left), in which Franciszek Raszeja was murdered

Raszeja was born on 2 April 1896 in Chełmno, (Kulm) in the family of a postal clerk, Ignacy and Maria, née Cichoń. When he was born and until he was about 22 this area was part of the German Empire. He attended the Chełmno Junior High School, where he made friends with Kurt Schumacher, a later SPD politician and activist.

During World War I he was conscripted into the German army, fought on the eastern front, and was taken captive and held in Tashkent. In 1918, he made his way through Finland and Sweden to Poland. He took part in the Polish-Bolshevik war as a medic. After studying medicine in Münster, Kraków and Poznań and obtaining the degree of doctor of medical sciences, Raszeja worked at the university hospital in Poznań. In 1928, he was one of the five founding members of the Polish Orthopaedic and Traumatic Society. Raszeja received his postdoctoral diploma in 1931 and became the director of an orthopaedic hospital in Swarzędz. At the same time, he headed an orthopaedic polyclinic in Poznań. Raszeja led to the reopening of the orthopaedic hospital of the Poznań University in 1935 and took over its management, an action that a year later resulted in him being awarded the title of professor. He later belonged to the Polish Academic Corporation Baltia.

In September 1939, after military actions had ceased, Raszeja worked as a doctor in Warsaw (from December 1939, he was the head of the surgical department of the Polish Red Cross Hospital) and taught at the Secret University of Warsaw. Raszeja contacted Professor Ludwik Hirszfeld, who was in the Warsaw Ghetto, and organized a blood donation campaign to help the Jewish population.

=== Death ===
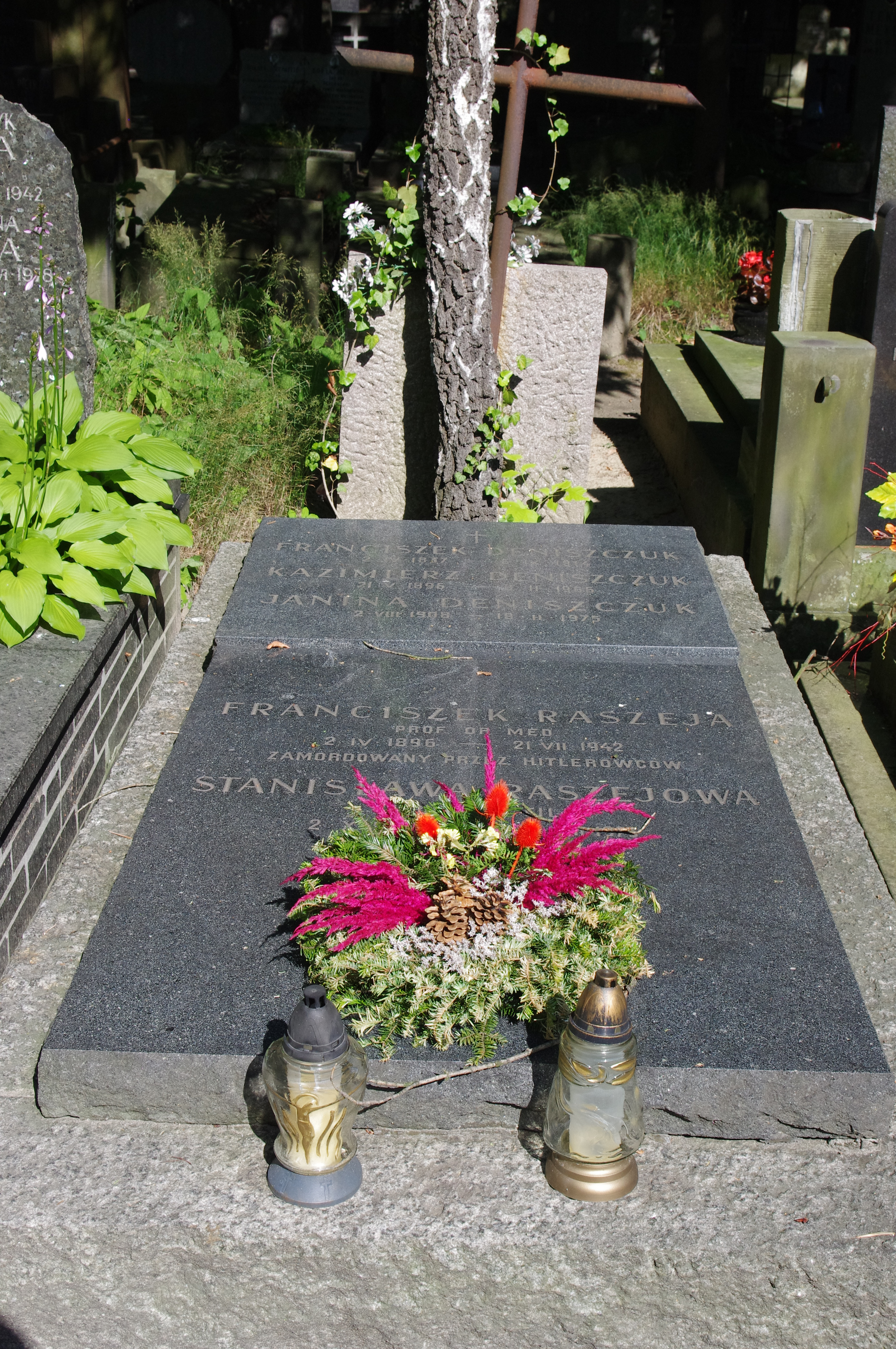
The Tomb of Franciszek Paweł Raszeja in the Old Powązki Cemetery

On 21 July 1942 he went to an apartment in a tenement house at Chłodna Street 26 in the ghetto to take care of a patient (he had a legal pass, which was required to enter the ghetto). Raszeja was murdered in the apartment along with his patient Abe Gutnajer, his family, two Jewish doctors and a nurse by the Gestapo under the command of SS-Sturmbannführer Hermann Höfle.

== Personal life ==
He married Stanisława Deniszczuk in 1923. They had two daughters: Bożena and Ewa.

== Honors ==
His name was given to the Municipal hospital in Poznań at Mickiewicz Street (opened in 1953), one of the streets in Warsaw, Koło district (present district of Wola), and a neighbourhood in Chełmno.

He received the Righteous Among the Nations title from Yad Vashem in on 11 April 2000.
