= Leon Raszeja =

Polish activist

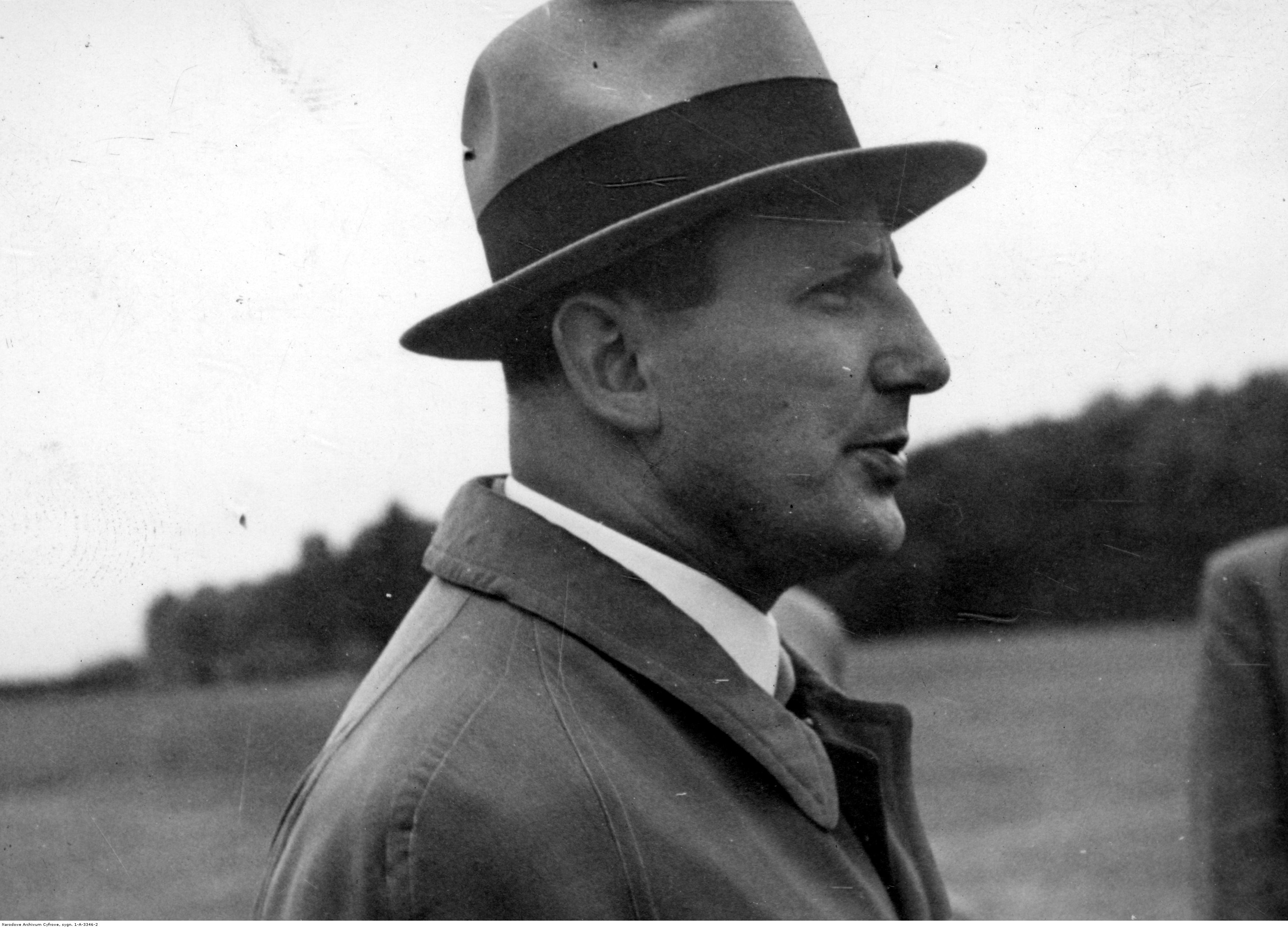
Leon Raszeja

Leon Raszeja (1901–1939) was a Polish lawyer and activist. He was President of Toruń from 1936 until his death in World War II.

== Family life and education ==
He was born in the family of a post office clerk Ignacy and Maria née Cichoń; he had a sister, Waleria and three brothers, Maksymilian, Alojzy and Franciszek. Max and Francis died during WWII.

He was a graduate of the classical gymnasium in Chełmno and a member of the Thomas Zan Society.

He began his studies at the Jagiellonian University and finished at the University of Poznań. He completed his master's degree in law in 1926.

== Career ==
Raszeja became a district judge in 1932; in 1934 he married pharmacist Maria and they had two children.

On 10 June 1936, the City Council of Toruń elected him as mayor of the city.

On 11 November 1937, he was awarded the Knight's Cross of the Order of Polonia Restituta.

In 1939, he established the Toruń Municipal Citizen Guard.

Raszeja was killed during an air raid in Lublin, on 9 September 1939.
