= Church of the Assumption of the Blessed Virgin Mary, Chełmno =

Coordinates: 53°20′52.8″N 18°25′18.1″E

Church of the Assumption of the Blessed Virgin Mary
- Kościół Wniebowzięcia Najświętszej Maryi Panny w Chełmnie
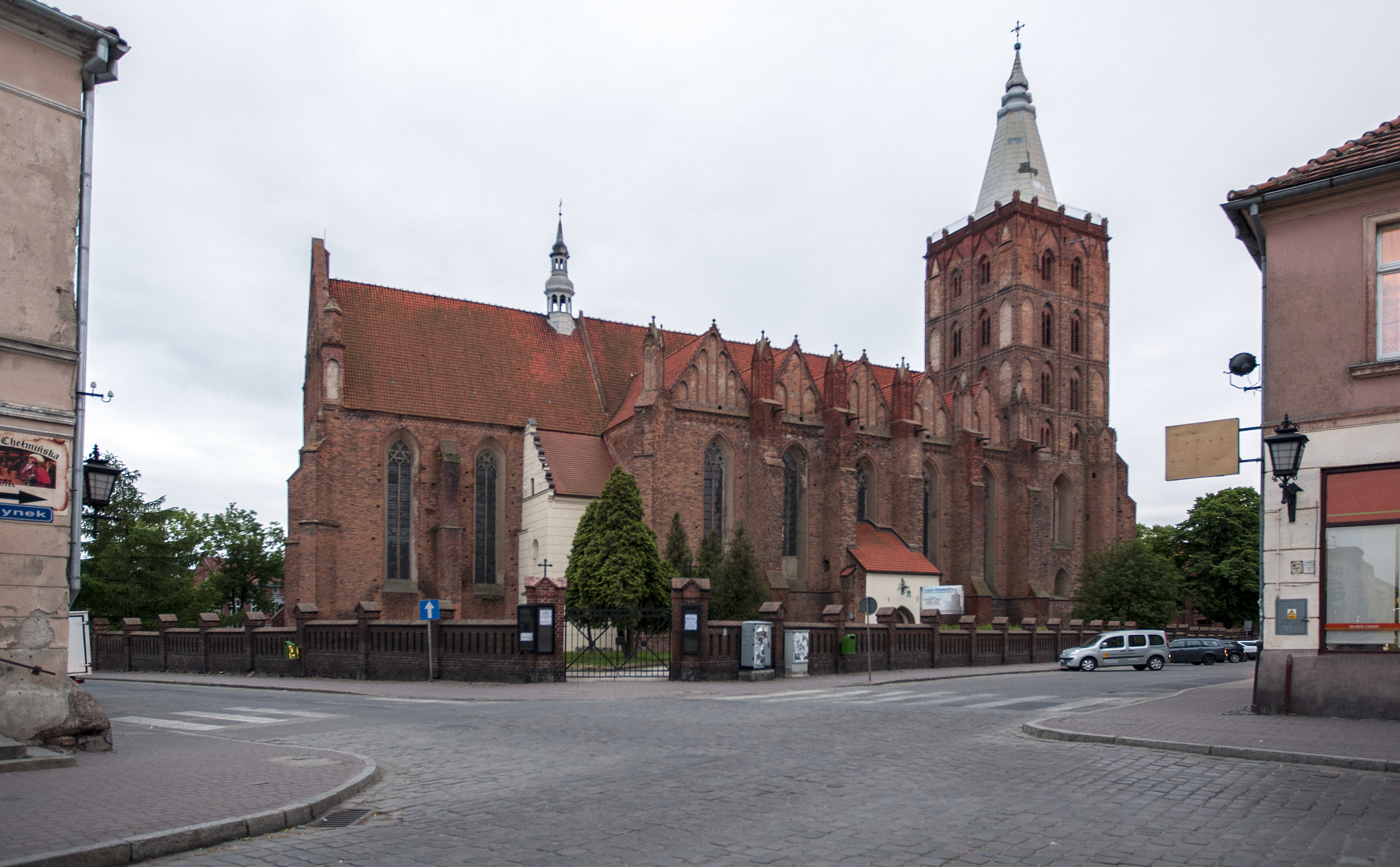
- Credit: Jerzy Strzelecki
- Church of the Assumption of the Blessed Virgin Mary
- Location: Chełmno
- Country: Poland
- Denomination: Catholic

History
- Founded: 13th century

Architecture
- Heritage designation: Register of monuments
- Style: Gothic

The Church of the Assumption of the Blessed Virgin Mary (Polish: Kościół Wniebowzięcia Najświętszej Maryi Panny w Chełmnie) is a Catholic church in Chełmno, Poland. It was founded in the 13th century, and its Gothic style is considered notably well preserved. The church was an influence for the Cathedral at Königsberg.

The church contains relics of St. Valentine and is on the register of monuments in Poland. The church is also located in the Chełmno Old Town, which is itself a Historic Monument of Poland, as designated by the President of Poland.

== History ==
Prior to the construction of the Church of the Assumption, the site contained a church that had been destroyed by Prussian forces.

Construction of the church started in 1280 and ended in 1320 or 1340. This initial work provided the church with its chancel, body, and nave. In the 16th century, a chapel designed by Mathias Niemojewski was added, in addition to two towers. Much of the interior work was finished by the 17th century.

== Relics of St. Valentine ==
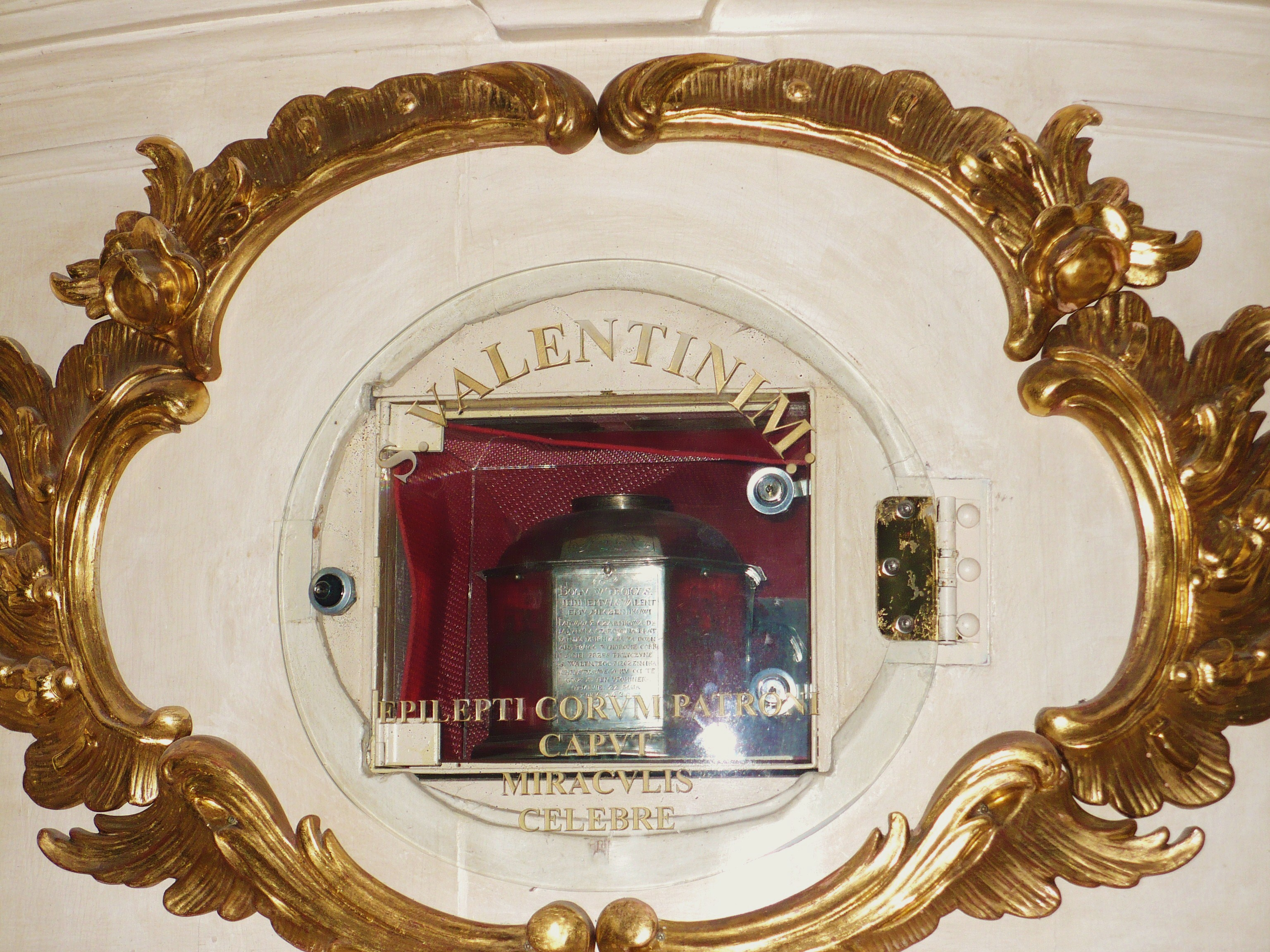
Relic of St. Valentine in silver reliquary

According to Rzeczpospolita, Fr. Jakub Fankidejski wrote in 1880 that the church possessed a small piece of the head of St. Valentine. By that time, the piece was stored in an octagonal silver reliquary about one foot in height. This reliquary was commissioned in 1630 by Jadwiga of Czarnków Działyńska in appreciation for a miracle allegedly performed by the relic.

The relic was restaged for viewing in 2002.

== Architecture ==
The brick church is designed in the hall style.
