= Grzegorz Gerwazy Gorczycki =

- Born: c. 1665–1667; Rozbark, Silesia
- Died: 30 April 1734; Kraków
- Known for: Music
- Movement: Baroque

Grzegorz Gerwazy Gorczycki (c. 1665–1667 – 30 April 1734) was a Polish Baroque composer. Considered one of the greatest composers of Polish Baroque music, he was called the "Polish Handel" during his lifetime.

== Life ==
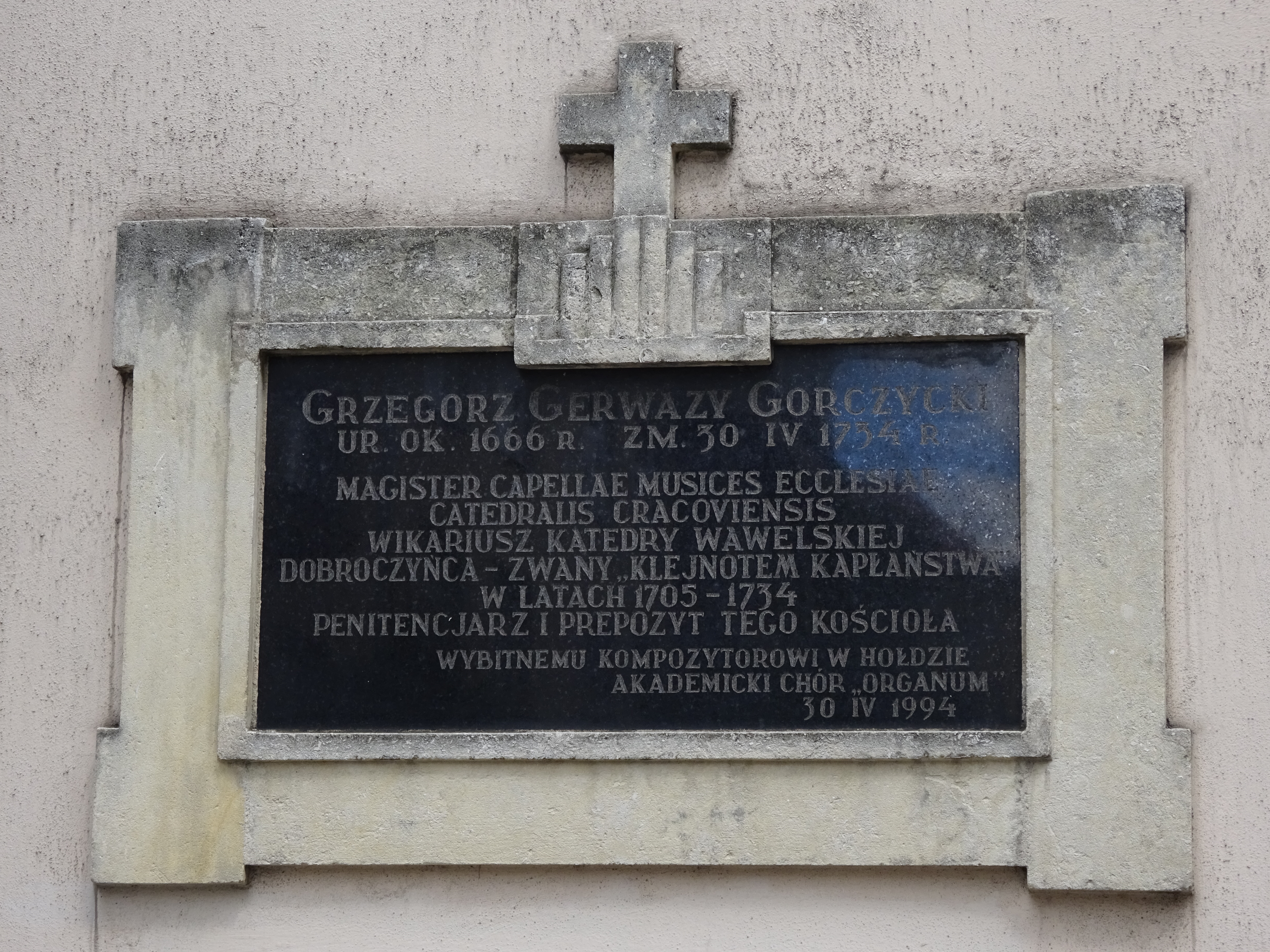
Commemorative plaque dedicated to Grzegorz Gerwazy Gorczycki on the facade of the Divine Mercy Church in Kraków

Born in Rozbark near Bytom in Silesia, then Habsburg-ruled Kingdom of Bohemia around 1665, little is known of his early life. Similarly little is known about his musical education; however, it is known that he attended the University of Prague, where he graduated from the department of Liberal Arts and Philosophy, and then attended the University of Vienna, where he gained a bachelor’s degree in theology. He arrived in Kraków in 1689 or 1690, where he then attended the Catholic Seminary. He was ordained on 22 March 1692.

Following his ordination, he was appointed to the academy for missionary priests in Chełmno in Pomerania, where he lectured in rhetoric and poetry, as well as conducting the local orchestra. After two years, he returned to Kraków, where he was appointed curate of the cathedral, and performed in the cathedral orchestra. He was appointed conductor on 10 January 1698, and remained in this position until his death on 30 April 1734.

The earliest recorded information on any of Gorczycki's works comes from 1694, but he must have written a substantial amount before 1698 in order to be appointed Kapellmeister. Unfortunately none of his compositions were ever published during his lifetime, so most of them have been lost; 39 works can, however, be attributed to him with surety.

== Works ==
Gorczycki wrote mainly church music: unaccompanied compositions for choir, sometimes with b.c. accompaniment in the stile antico (motets, masses, songs), as well as vocal-instrumental works with b.c. accompaniment in the stile moderno featuring rich, concertato technique, multi-sectional and verse sacred concertos as well as ensemble cantatas.

Gorczycki is regarded as an outstanding Polish composer of the high baroque. He used the most advanced achievements of the compositional techniques of the time.

His work is essentially divided into three strands:

=== Works in the Stile Antico ===
These are works for 4 part choir, either a cappella or with small accompanying ensemble. It is here we see Gorczycki's mastery of counterpoint; he wrote masses, as well as arrangements of introits, antiphons, offertories and hymns which all belong to this category.

Examples include:

- Missa paschalis
- Missa "Rorate"
- Sepulto Domino
- Tota pulchra es Maria
- Dignare me laudare te
- Ave Maria

=== Works in the Concertante style ===
This style was more popular at the time, as opposed to the Renaissance style of the above works. These works were composed for small ensemble and choir.

Examples include:

- Laetatus sum
- In virtute tua
- Conductus funebris
- Completorium
- Illuxit sol
- Litaniae de Providentia Divina

=== Instrumental works ===
Whilst this section of his work is small, it is known that Gorczycki did write instrumental pieces; in 1962 evidence of a Ball Polonaise was discovered, however only a violin part remains. There is also evidence that the orchestra of Wieluń had Gorczycki's Ouverture ex D in its repertory.
