= Nazi mass murders in Kuyavian-Pomeranian Voivodeship (1939–1945) =

Mass murders, WWII, Poland

Nazi German mass murders, Kuyavian-Pomeranian Voivodeship
- Part of Operation Tannenberg
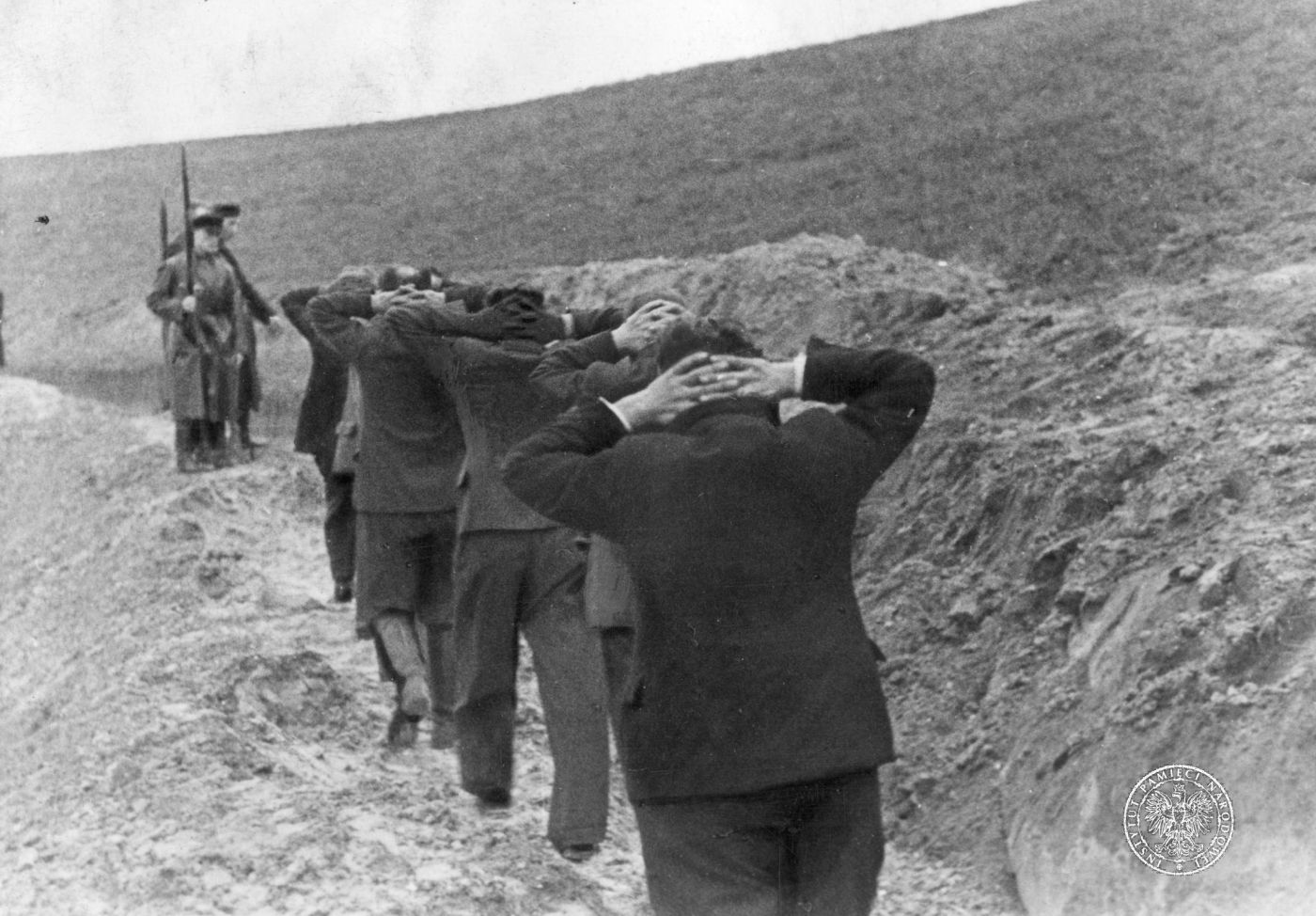
- Polish teachers from Bydgoszcz led by members of the Volksdeutscher Selbstschutz to their execution site

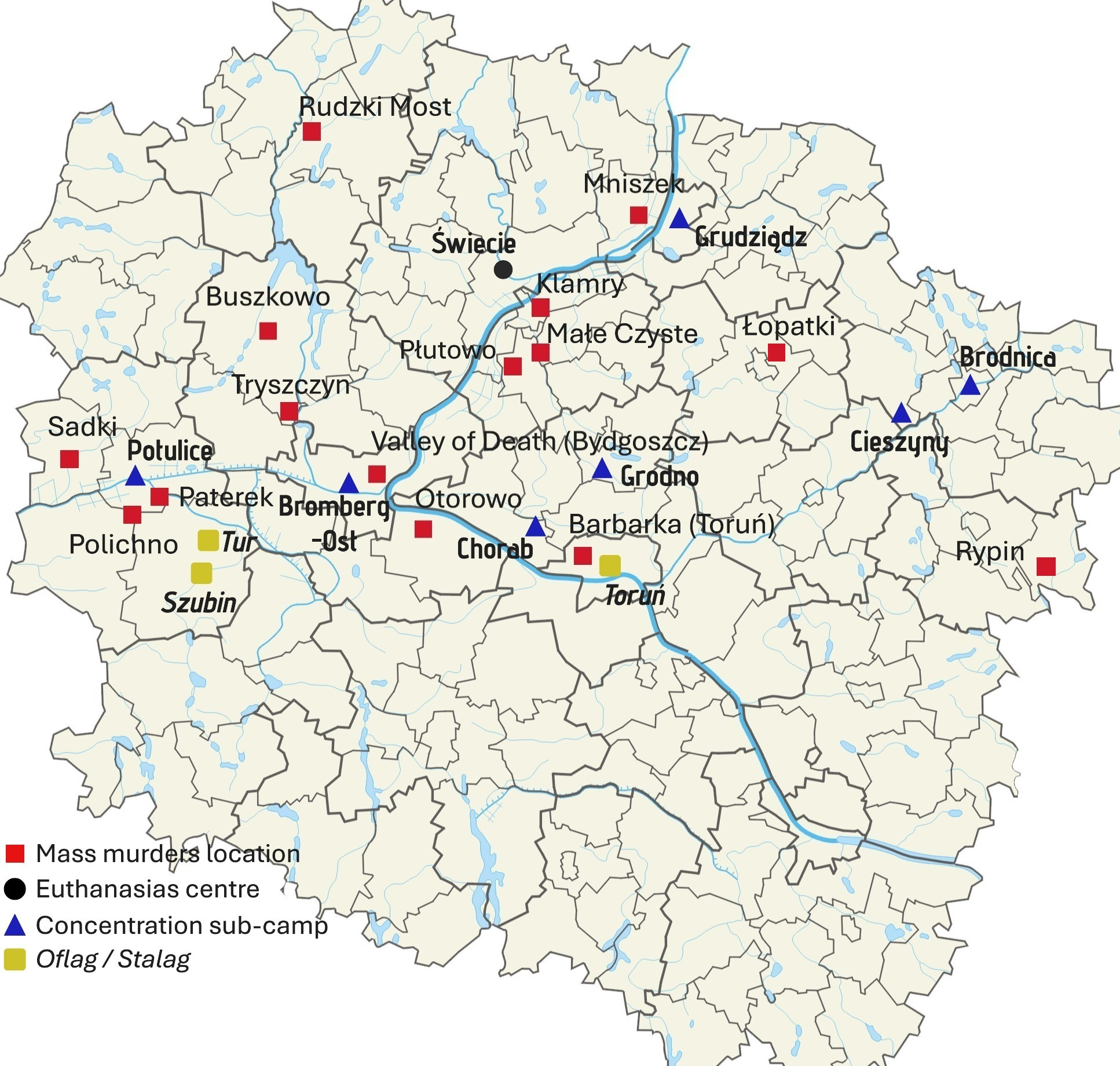
- Mass murder locations in Kujawsko-Pomorskie
- Date: September 1, 1939- May 8, 1945
- Attack type: Genocidal massacre, mass shooting
- Weapon: Firearms
- Deaths: 22900 to 24000 deaths
- Perpetrator: Nazi Germany

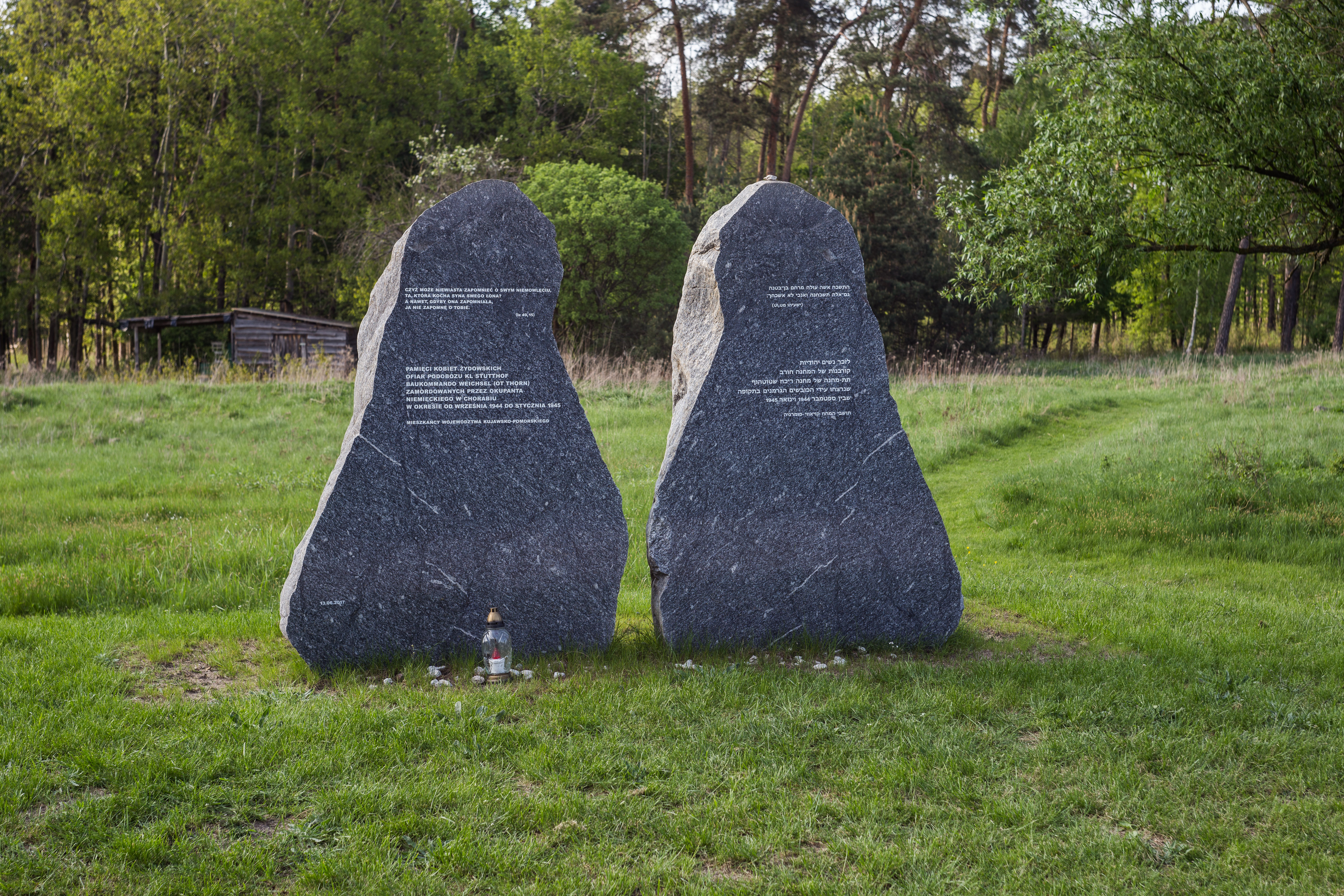
Monument to the memory of Jewish women murdered in the sub-camp in Chorab

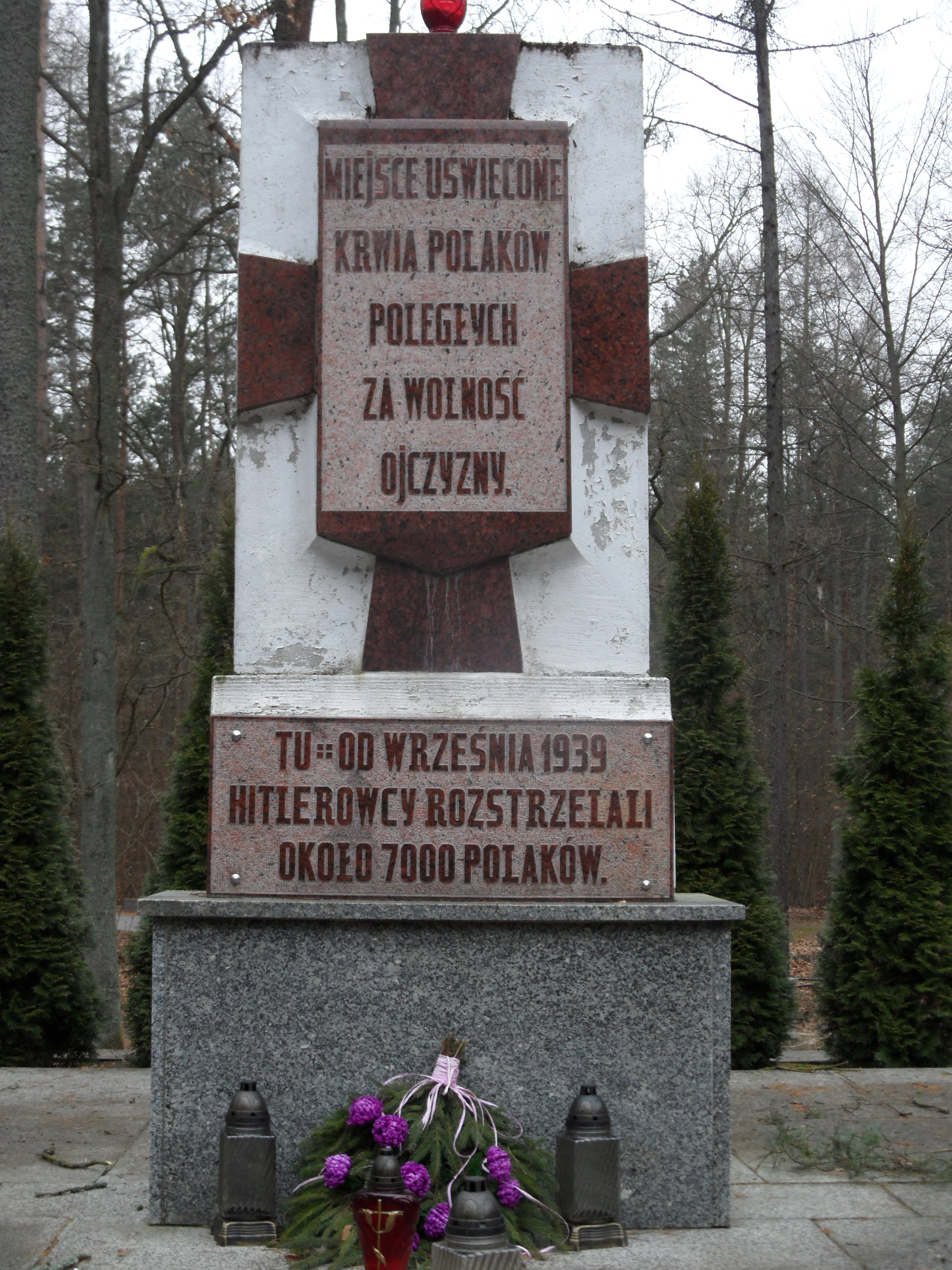
Szpegawsk forest monument

As part of Operation Tannenberg (German: Unternehmen Tannenberg, Polish: Operacja Tannenberg), an organized anti-Polish extermination, Nazi Germany committed many mass murders in present-day Kuyavian-Pomeranian Voivodeship, mainly in the first months of WWII.

== Rejencja Bydgoska ==
Under Nazi rule, the present territory of Kuyavian-Pomeranian Voivodeship was under the control of two different administrative bodies (Reichsgau): the Reichsgau Danzig-West Prussia in the north and the Reichsgau Wartheland (Poznań) in the south.

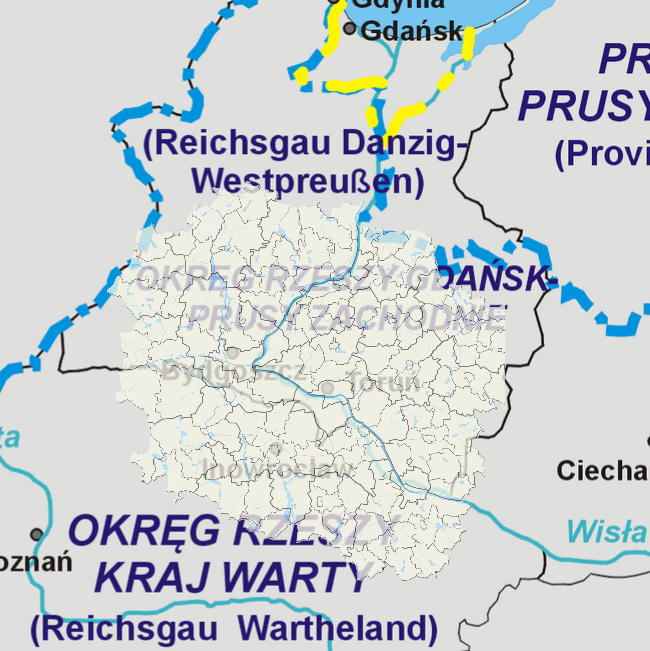
Reichsgaus with Kuyawian Pomeranian Voivodeship borders

== Overview ==
Shootings were conducted with the use of a proscription list targeting Poland’s elite, compiled by the Gestapo in the two years before the invasion of Poland. SS Einsatzgruppen have been carrying out the mass executions.

Operation Tannenberg was followed by the shooting and gassing of hospital patients and disabled adults, as part of the wider Aktion T4 programme.

Furthermore, the present Kuyavian-Pomeranian Voivodeship territory housed several prisoner of war (POW) camps, Oflags ("Officer camp") or Stalags ("Base camp") for enlisted POWs:

- Oflag 64 in Szubin;
- a sub-camp of Stalag XXI B in Tur;
- Stalag XX-A in Toruń.

== Concentration sub-camps ==
In the region were also installed sub-camps subordinated to the Stutthof concentration camp, especially in:

- Potulice;
- Bydgoszcz;
- Cieszyny;
- Grodno;
- Chorab;
- Grudziądz.

== Mass euthanasia (Aktion T4) ==
SS functionaries, hospital staff and police personnel performed killings by shooting and gassing hospital patients and disabled adults.

In the Kuyavian-Pomeranian Voivodeship territory, the hospital of Świecie saw the execution of 1350 people between October and November 1939.

At the end of September 1939, a special Nazi commission headed by Dr. Erich Grossman began a selection of patients, directly sentencing most of them to death. Only around 300 of those fit for work were taken to a hospital in Kocborowo, but they were later murdered in the Szpęgawsk Forest. Józef Bednarz, the Polish hospital director at the time, died along with the patients in Mniszek.

== Mass killings ==
=== Valley of Death ===
In the Valley of Death (Polish: Dolina Śmierci), located in Fordon, Bydgoszcz, Nazi Germans committed the mass murder of 1,200–1,400 Poles and Jews at the beginning of World War II (October and November 1939). The executions were performed by the local German Selbstschutz and the Gestapo.

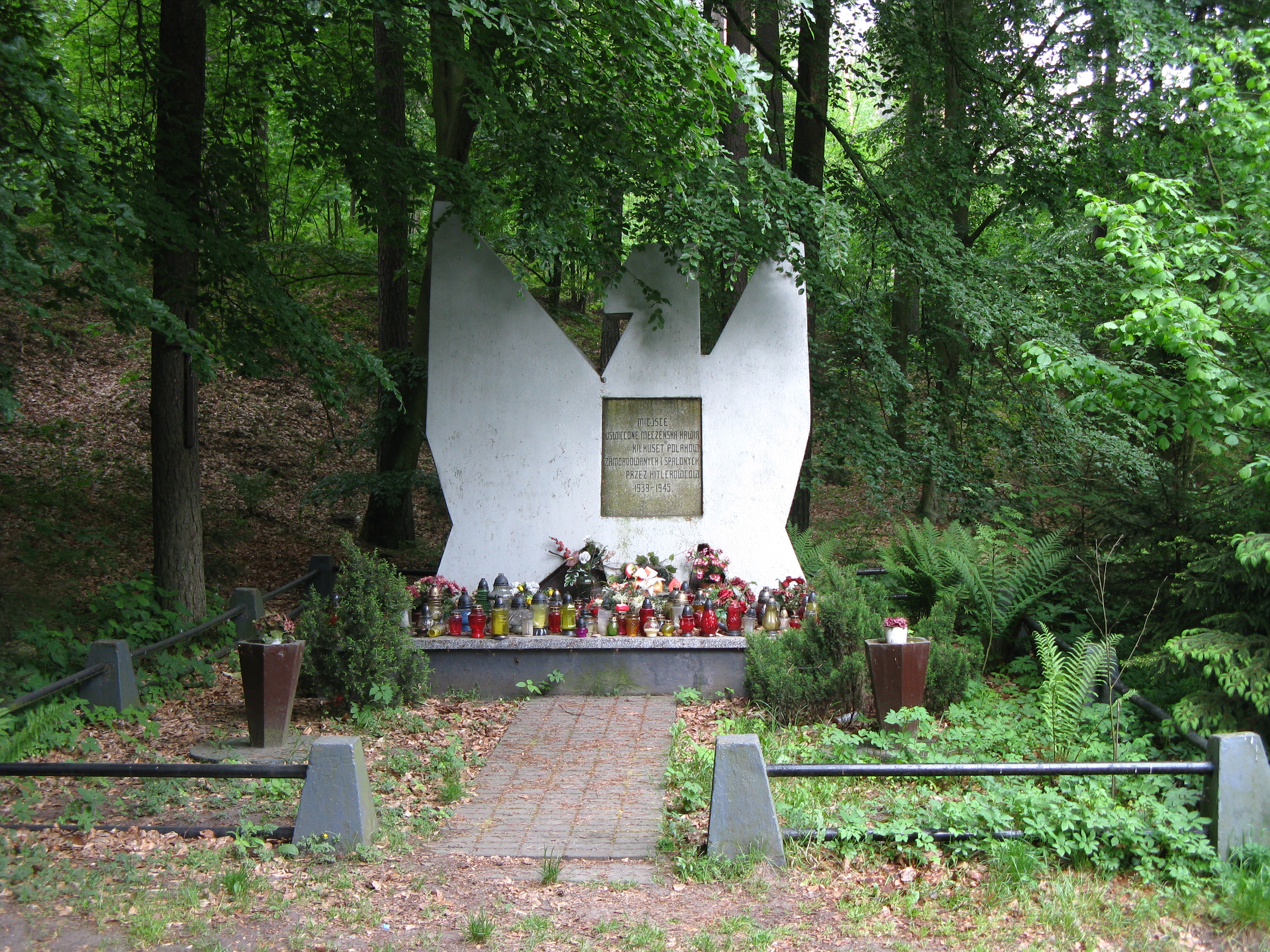
Monument dedicated to Poles murdered in Birkenek

=== Brzezinki ===
Mass arrests of the inhabitants of Brodnica and the Brodnica district began in mid-October 1939 and were carried out mainly by local Selbstschutz. Arrested people were usually placed in several basements: the infamous Villa Krasiński, a house at Paderewskiego street where were located the headquarters of the Brodnica Gestapo, a monastery building at Sądowa street and for a certain period in the military barracks at Czwartaków street.

The prisoners were very often personally abused by the head of the Brodnica Selbstschutz, Kurt Kortas. In addition, prisoners were given starvation rations, and their families were forbidden from bringing food parcels.

Mass executions usually took place in the forest on the Birkenek estate (currently Brzezinki) near Zbiczno, a few kilometres north of Brodnica. Before the war, the estate belonged to Kurt Höltzel, a well-known German cooperative activist who died during the evacuation in September 1939. The mass executions lasted from 10 to 28 October 1939.

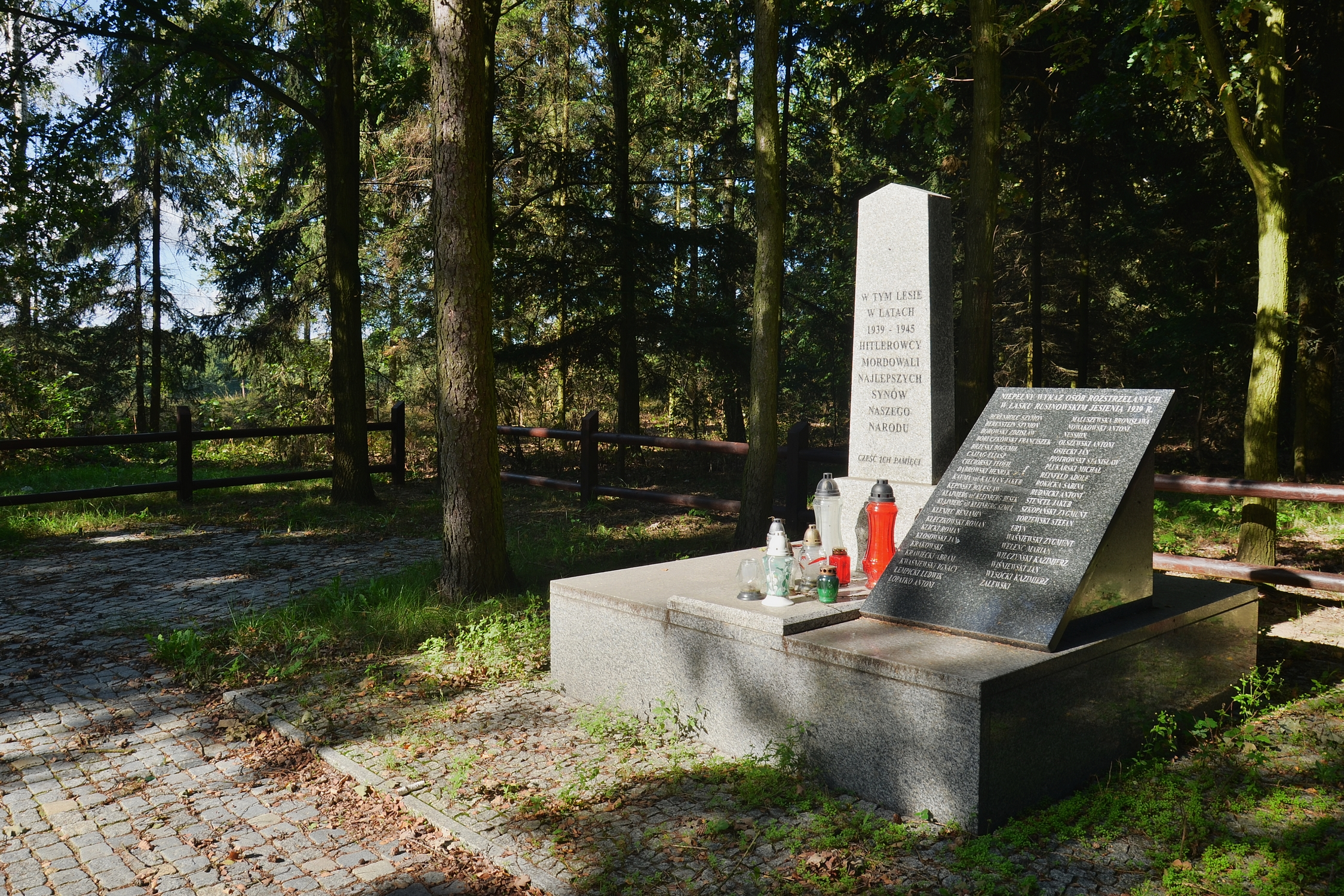
Monument in Rusinowo forest

=== State Police Commissariat in Rypin ===
In the former headquarters of the State Police Commissariat in Rypin, during the early months of the German occupation of Poland, members of the paramilitary Volksdeutscher Selbstschutz and Gestapo officers detained, tortured, and murdered the residents of the Dobrzyń Land. In fall of 1939, most of the 1,000 Poles and Jews who had been jailed in the basement of the house at 20 Warszawska Street, had been murdered inside the building, or in nearby forests of Skrwilno and Rusinowo.

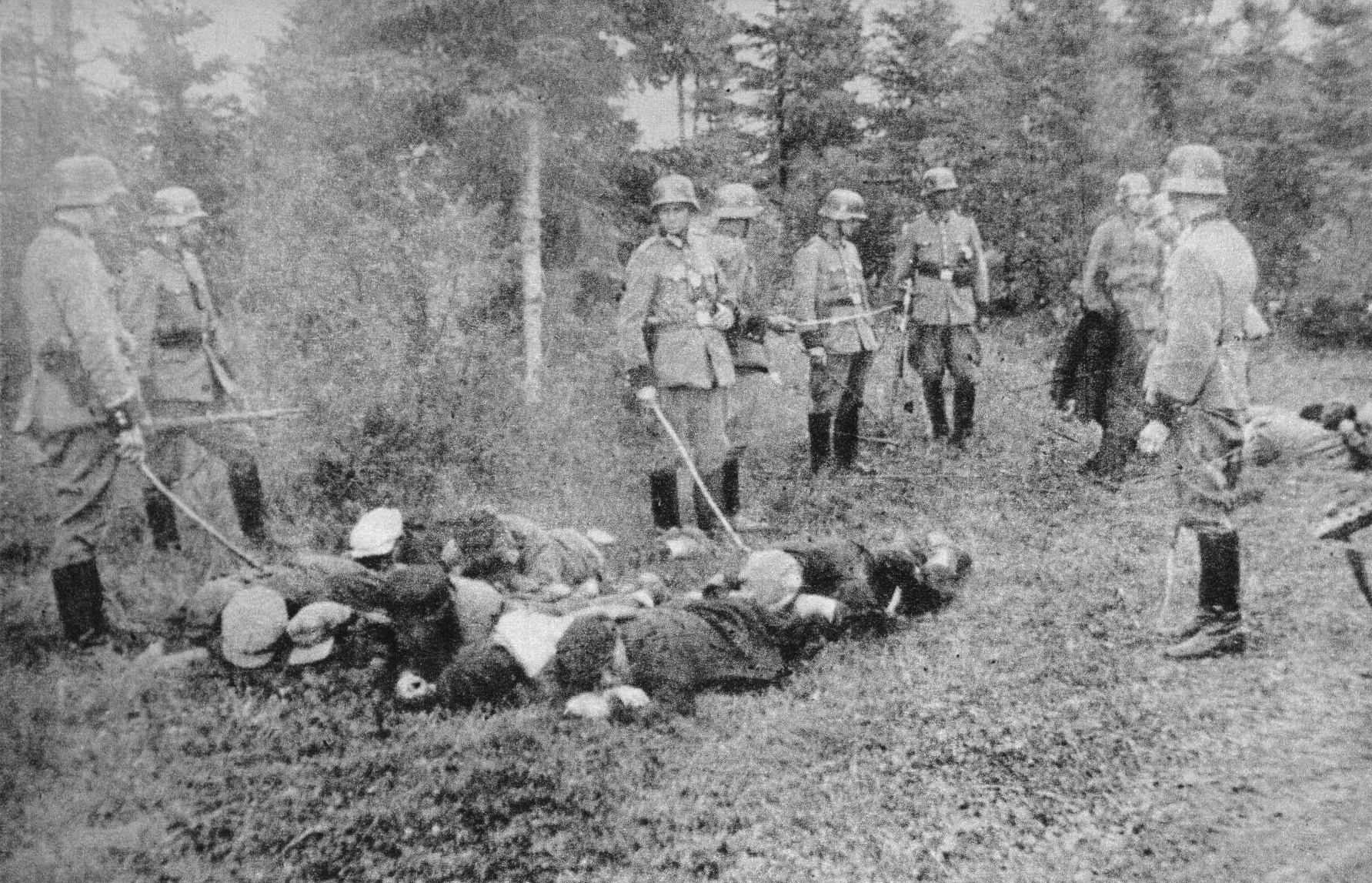
Selbstschutz members conducting mass executions near Rudzki Most

=== Rudki Most ===
On the 22 October 1939, mass arrests occurred, gathering Poles of the so-called leadership class as well as farmers from nearby villages. The prisoners were systematically shot in Rudzki Most forest near Tuchola, on 24 October, 27 October, 30 October, 2 November, 6 November (unconfirmed), 10 and 11 November 1939. Shootings were carried out by members of the paramilitary Volksdeutscher Selbstschutz, led by officers of the SS.

After the war, six mass graves were discovered, containing 237 bodies.

=== Buskowo and Srebrnica ===
A series of executions carried out by SS officers and Selbstschutz militias, in October 1939 in the forest of Buszkowo near Koronowo made about 150 victims.

The mass murder was led by chief of Koronowo's Selbstschutz, Joachim Otto, a landowner's son from Kotomierz. Wehrmacht soldiers, officers of the SD and security police placed arrested people in cells of the pre-war prison in Koronowo, located on the grounds of the 14th century Cistercian monastery. Historian Włodzimierz Jastrzębski estimated the number of people shot in Buszkowo at at least 114, based on the results of post-war exhumations carried out on April 14, 1948.

Furthermore, on 26 October 1939, Germans arrested 12 respected citizens of Koronowo, including mayor Maksymilian Talaśka, and several merchants and craftsmen: they were taken the same day to a nearby forest in Srebrnica and killed. In the autumn of 1944, in order to erase the traces of their crimes, Nazi forces dug up, transported and burned the bodies of Poles murdered in Srebrnica.

=== Mniszek ===
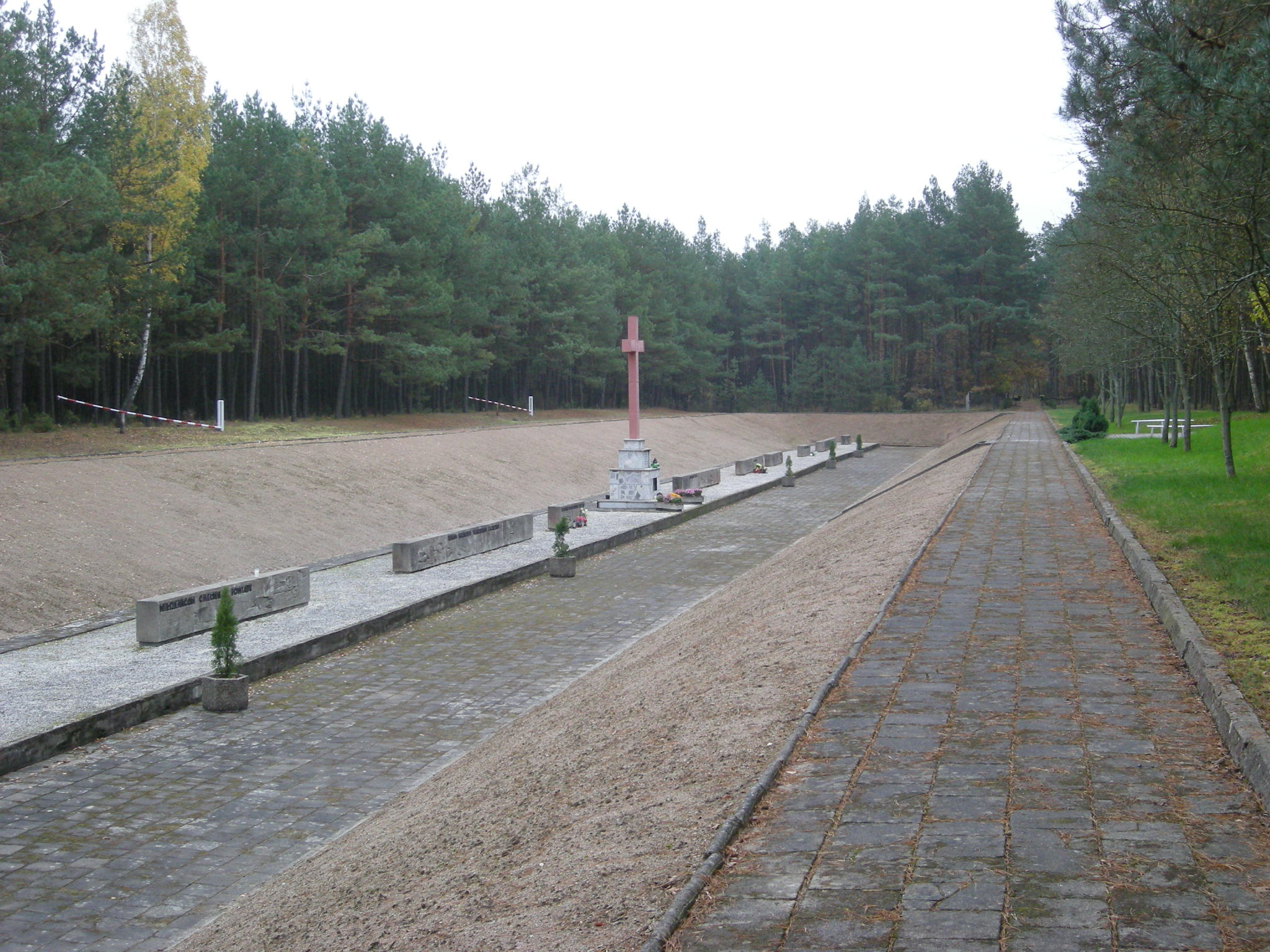
Mniszek cemetery

Near the towns of Mniszek and Grupa, a forest complex north-east of Świecie was the location of mass executions perpetrated by German Selbstschutz during the first months of the war (October 1939 – April 1940). It is estimated that during the years of German occupation, nearly 10,000 people were murdered there. The murdered were buried in common graves, which were dug by local villagers.

Among the victimes were representatives of the Polish elite, local members of the political powiats (Świecie, Bydgoszcz, Chełmno, Grudziądz, Starogard), patients of the psychiatric hospital in Świecie, Jews, prisoners of war (POW) from various countries and members of the resistance movement. In addition, among the fallen were 17 Roman Catholic priests from Świecie and the surrounding area.

From the spring of 1940, the pace of extermination decreased significantly, but the executions had been carried out until the last days of the German occupation.

In mid-1944, with the approach of the Red Army, German troops attempted to remove the traces of their crimes: they brought Soviet POWs to work on digging up and burning the bodies. The POWs had been murdered on the spot six weeks later.

Mniszek cemetery is the second largest cemetery of victims of Nazi genocide in Pomerania.

=== Barbarka ===
The Barbarka massacre was a series of mass executions carried out by SS officers and members of the paramilitary Selbstschutz in the autumn of 1939, in the Barbarka forest near Toruń.

Polish historians estimate that at least 600 people were murdered in Barbarka: they were prisoners of the internment camp set up by the Nazi in the casemates of Toruń Fortress (so called Fort VII).

=== Klamry ===
Mass executions in the Rybieniec forest near Klamry lasted from 12 October to 11 November 1939. The site was located 6 kilometres (3.7 mi) east of Chełmno and a short distance from a makeshift internment camp in Fort VIII, a former Prussian segment of the Chełmno Fortress.

The murders were carried out by the local Selbstschutz, possibly with the support of Einsatzgruppen units. It is estimated that between 2,000 and 2,500 people were murdered in Klamry.

Among the victims shot were Jews, teachers from the area (Bartlewo, Bieńkówka, Brzozowo, Czarże, Dorposz Szlachecki, Drzonowo, Unisław, Trzebcz Królewski, Różnowo, Pniewite, Watorowo, Lisewo, Malankowo, Mozgowina and Nowawieś Chełmińska), engineers, craftsmen, farmers as well as Catholic priests from Wielkie Czyste, Wabcz, Sarnowo and Chełmno.

In the second half of 1944, with the approach of the Red Army, the Germans began to erase the traces of their crimes. A group of Jewish prisoners were forced to dig up the graves and burn the bodies of the victims. They were immediately murdered once their work completed.

=== Male Czyste ===
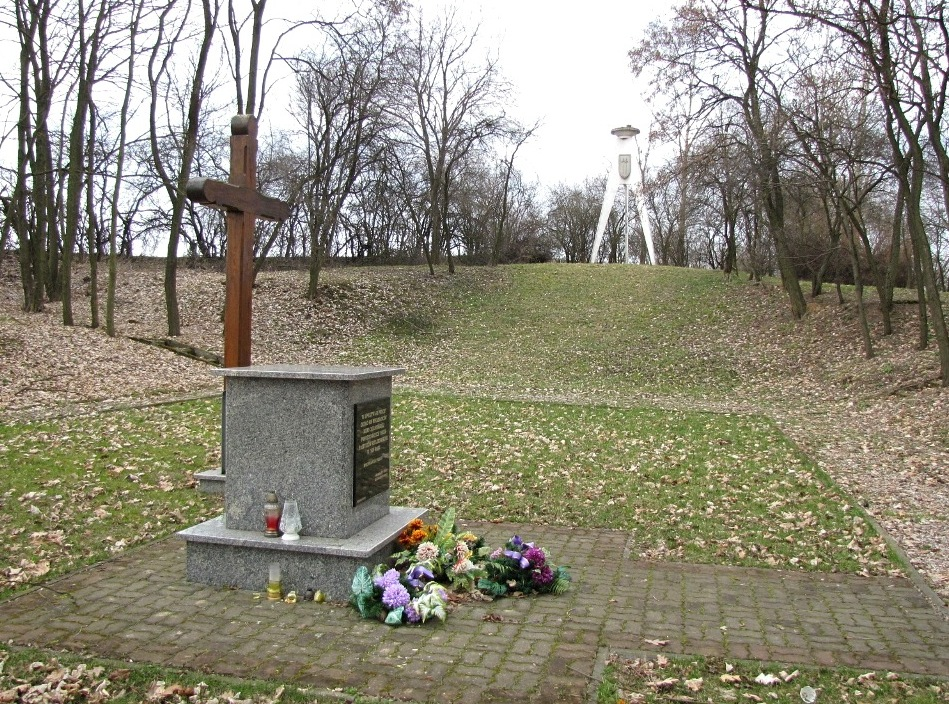
Małe Czyste execution site

Selbstschutzmen members chose an inactive sandpit located between the villages of Małe Czyste and Dorposz Szlachecki as the place of mass executions. Murders took place from September to November 1939: historian Maria Wardzyńska estimates the number of victims between 400 and 800.

The majority of the victims were prisoners of the temporary detention centre in Dorposz Szlachecki: Catholic priests, farmers, teachers, officials and members of resistance movements from Chełmno, Kijewo Królewskie, Starogród and Unisław.

A few Poles managed to escape from the place of execution, reporting about the Nazi's modus operandi.

In August 1944, with the Red Army approcahing, a special German unit quartered near the place of execution burned the bodies of the victims for two days and two nights. After the war, the execution site revealed ashes of the murdered, bone fragments, buttons, belt buckles, etc. A monument has been erected at the execution place to honor the victims.

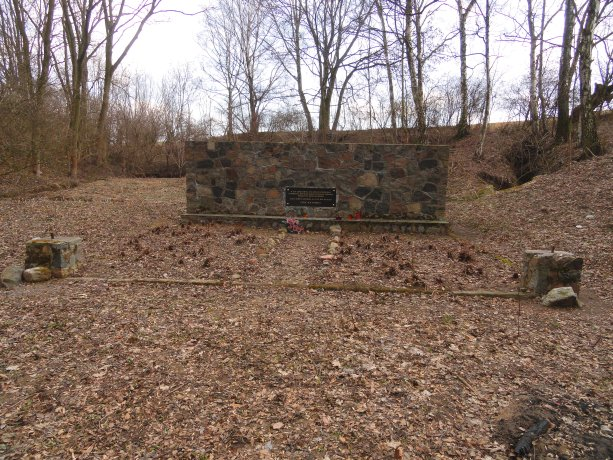
Monument at the execution site in Płutowo

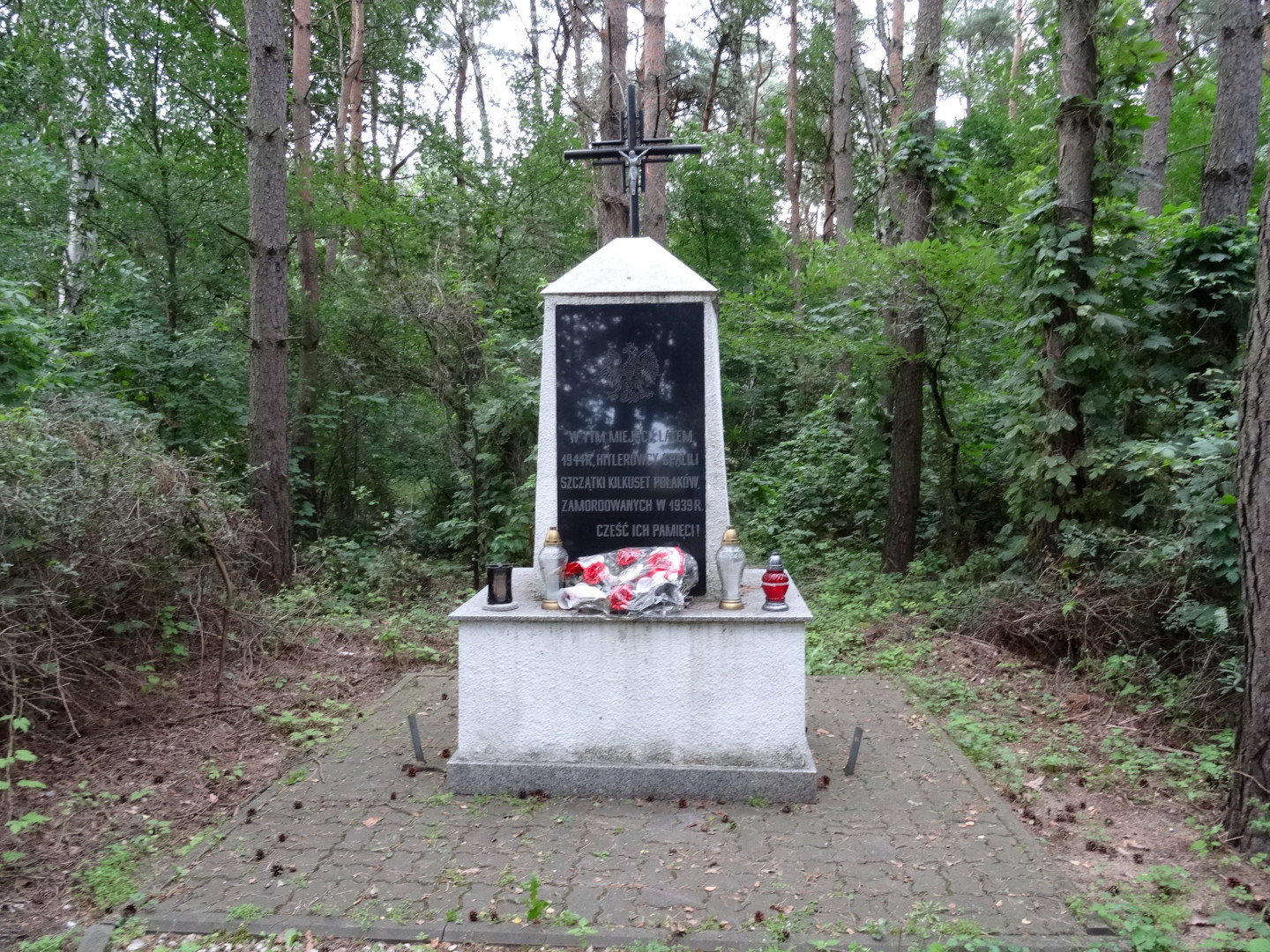
Monument at the execution site in Otorowo

=== Plutowo ===
In October and November 1939, a series of executions took place nearby a forest wash situated along the road leading to Szymborno. Local Selbstschutz murdered there about 230 Poles held in a near camp: farmers, teachers and the headmaster of the school from Unisław.

Near the end of the conflict, traces of the mass killings were erased, by dugging up and burning the corpses in the village of Małe Czyste. In 1945, Polish authorities found back an overlooked grave, containing eighteen bodies. After the war, a monument was erected at the execution site to honor the victims.

=== Otorowo ===
In a forest area near the village of Otorowo, between Solec Kujawski and Bydgoszcz, Germans shot several hundred people in multiple executions. These killings had been supervised by officers of the Gdańsk Einsatzkommando 16 (a special Einsatzgruppen of the German security police) and SiPo, between October and November 1939. The bodies of the victims, coming from Bydgoszcz and villages in the vicinity (Wudzyn, Otorowo, Osielsko, Stronno, Żołędowo) were buried in trenches dug out for the September Campaign.

There is no surviving evidence of the executions carried out in Otorowo, hence the exact number of Poles murdered there remains unknown. After the war, only 33 victims could have been identified.

=== Tryszczyn ===
The mass murders in Tryszczyn began on 28 September 1939, and lasted until about mid-October. They were carried out near the village of Tryszczyn, about 10 kilometres (6.2 mi) north of Bydgoszcz. Germans used the trenches stretching along the banks of the Brda river, dug in the local forests or fields by Polish soldiers from the 62nd Infantry Regiment before the start of WWII.

Three to four times a day, batches of 50-70 convicts were brought from Bydgoszcz by trucks to a place deep in the forest, from where they were walked to the trenches. They were then murdered by shots to the back of the head. Only one person managed to escape the execution alive: Dr. Jan Rzadkowolski, thanks to the help of his family and farmers from Tryszczyn, could leave to Warsaw, where he died during the occupation. The evidence indicates that the crime in Tryszczyn was committed primarily by members of the Selbstschutz.

Based on a survey conducted in 1945 by the District Commission for the Investigation of Nazi Crimes, some historians state that between 1400 and 1500 victims of Nazi terror had been buried in six mass graves on the Brda River. However, the graves also contained Polish soldiers killed during the September Campaign, prisoners murdered by the Bydgoszcz Gestapo, and 200 Soviet prisoners of war in German captivity. Most of the victims shot by the Selbstschutz were people of Bydgoszcz elite denizens, members of clergy and farmers from nearby towns. In addition, nearly 70 Polish scouts and 370 Jews imprisoned in the barracks near Golub-Dobrzyń were slaughtered.

Around mid-October 1939, Nazi forces stopped carrying out mass executions in Tryszczyn. As the ditches by the Brda River were already filled with bodies of victims, the perpetrators turned to Fordon, located closer to Bydgoszcz, to resume mass murders.

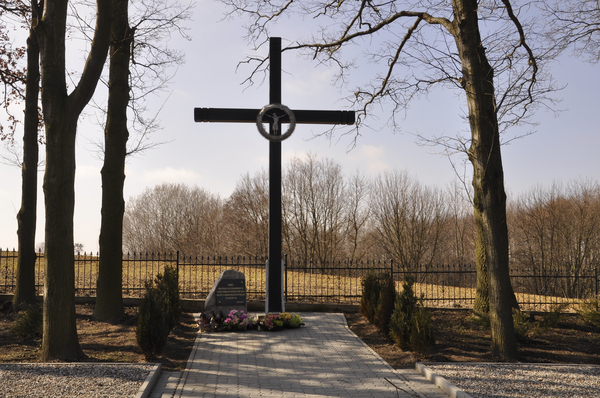
War cemetery of victims of Nazi terror in Tryszczyn

In 1945, Polish authorities have been investigating the events in Tryszczyn. The key witness was forester Henryk Bolcek, who came to the shooting site at night, took measurements and sketches. After the war, thanks to his notes, almost all the burial sites could be found back. At the turn of April and May 1945, Polish authorities carried out a partial exhumation of the victims of the crime in Tryszczyn. Several hundred bodies were extracted from five mass graves, which were then buried in one grave along the road connecting Bydgoszcz with Koronowo. Three years later, the bodies were exhumed, 128 coffins containing the remains of 693 victims were displayed on 4 May 1948, on the Old Market Square in Bydgoszcz. After a memorial ceremony, the coffins were transported and laid to rest at the Bydgoszcz Martyrs Cemetery on Freedom Hill.

The exhumations have never been complete (one of the mass graves was never found), that is why the site of the Tryszczyn crime keeps the status of war grave. In October 2009, additional exhumation works uncovered 2213 bone fragments belonging to 48 people. They were placed in a coffin and buried in the cemetery in Tryszczyn.

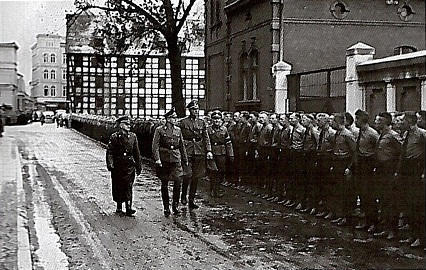
Inspection of Selbstschutz unit in Bydgoszcz. From the left: Josef Meier, Werner Kampe, Ludolf von Alvensleben

Only a few criminals were brought to trial in Polish courts:

- Albert Forster, Gauleiter of the NSDAP and Reich Governor in the Reichsgau Danzig-West Prussia, was sentenced to death in 1948 by the National Tribunal in Gdańsk for crimes committed in Pomerania in the years 1939–1945. The sentence was carried out on 28 February 1952, at the Mokotów Prison;
- Richard Hildebrandt, SS and Police leader in the District of Gdańsk-West Prussia, was sentenced to death by a Polish court in Bydgoszcz. The sentence was carried out on 10 March 1951;
- Max Henze, SS-Brigadeführer, who had served as the police president in Bydgoszcz since 12 October 1939, was sentenced to death. He was hanged on 10 March 1951.

Other escaped trials:

- Ludolf von Alvensleben, the leader of the Pomeranian Selbstschutz, fled to Argentina after the end of the war;
- proceedings against the commanders of the Bydgoszcz Selbstschutz Erich Spaarmann and Josef Meier, were discontinued in May 1963;
- Werner Kampe, the former head of the district NSDAP organization and mayor of Bydgoszcz, saw his prosecution discontinued in 1965, by decision of the prosecutor's office in Munich;
- Dr. Rudolf Oebsger-Röder, from the SD Einsatzgruppen 16 in Bydgoszcz, worked in the 1950s in the West German Federal Intelligence Service and then moved to Jakarta to work as a spokesman for the house and court of Indonesian dictator Suharto.

=== Paterek ===
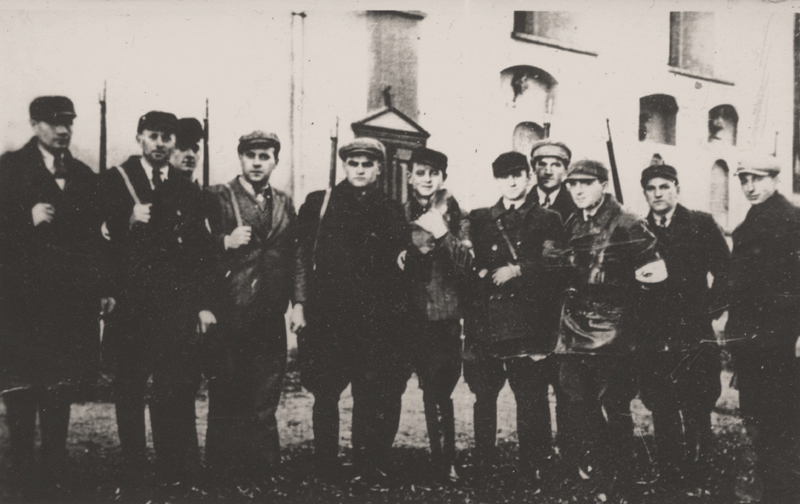
Members of the Łobżenice Selbstschutz. Harry Schulz is the fifth from the left

In October 1939, Selbstschutz members set their views on a valley located in a former gravel pit in the town of Paterek, 5 kilometres (3.1 mi) from Nakło nad Notecią: it will be the site for mass murders, carried out from on 5 October to 24 November 1939. Death sentences were approved by a self-appointed commission consisting of members of the Nakło Selbstschutz: Rudolf Öhlmann (director of the sugar factory), Otto Lahmann (a master carpenter), brothers Johann and Kurt Fritz (merchant and industrialist), carpenter Finke and clerk Prahl. The future victims were jailed for two weeks in the Nakło prison or in the basements of the local grammar school. Handcuffed, they were then driven to the execution site and shot, usually at night. In Paterek, around 200 Poles and Jews were murdered and buried in 13 mass graves; it was the second largest place of execution of Polish population in the Wyrzysk district after Łobżenica.

In particular, on the night of 11 to 12 November 1939, an execution personally led by Harry Schulz, the deputy commander of the Łobżenica paramilitary Selbstschutz, murdered clergy from Górka Klasztorna: 48 priests, monks and two nuns from the Congregation of the Sisters Servants.

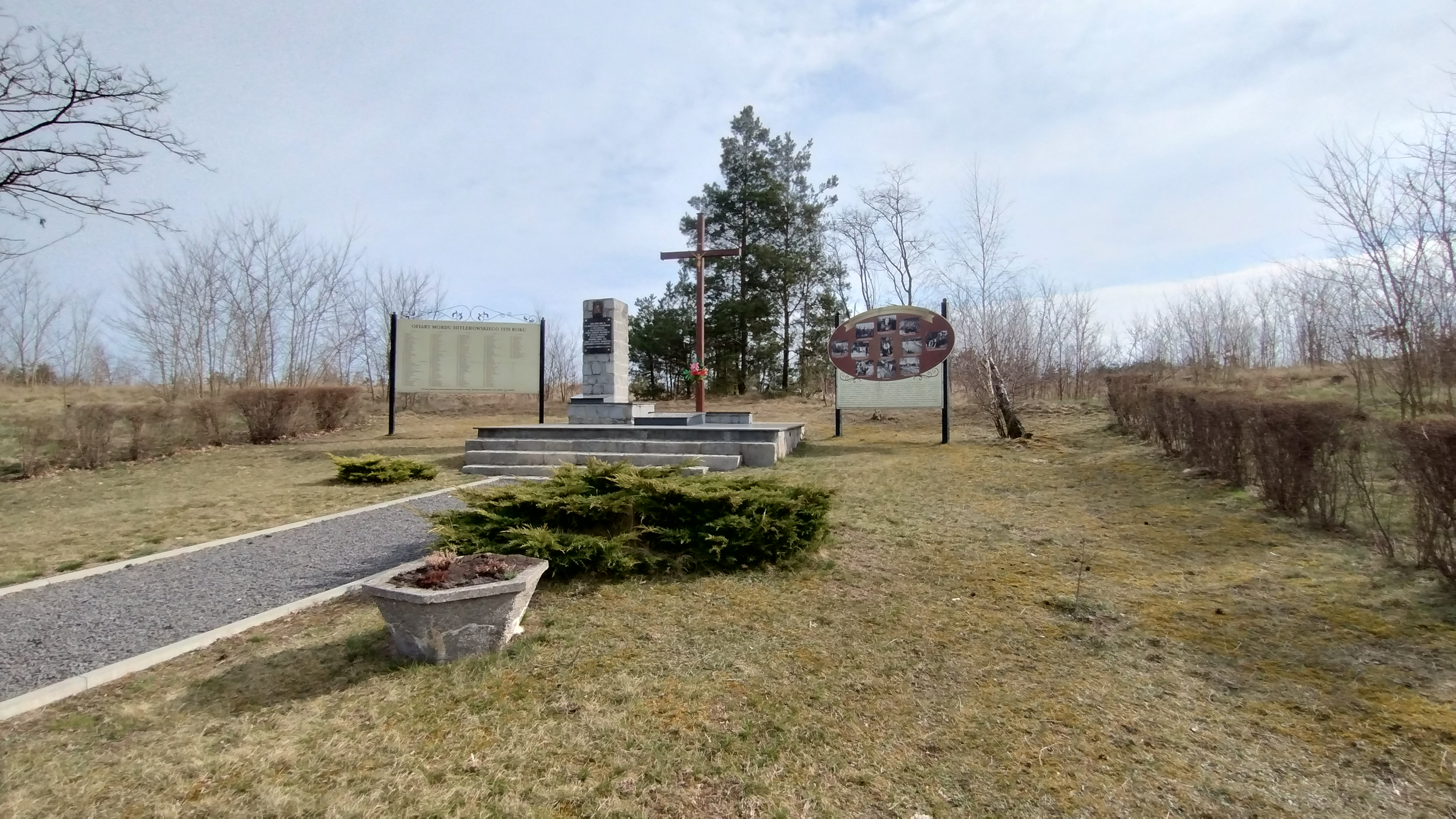
Paterek monument to Nazi victims

Shortly after the end of hostilities (3-5 July 1945), German convicts from the Potulice concentration camp exhumed 218 bodies, of which 137 were identified. They were then transferred to the cemetery in Nakło. On the scene of the executions, a monument was erected to honor the victims.

After the war, Harry Schulz hid under an assumed name in Szczecin. In 1953, he was accidentally recognized, arrested and sentenced to death by hanging. The sentence was carried out on 22 February 1954. Werner Köpenick, the commander of the Selbstschutz of the Wyrzysk district, settled in West Germany after the war and was never brought to justice.

=== Sadki ===
Victims were executed in the vicinity of Sadki on two sites:

- a marshy ravine along the road from Sadki to Mrozowo;
- a meadow near the Rokitka river (a tributary of the Noteć), to the north-east of Sadki.

From October to November 1939, members of the Selbstschutz (possibly assisted by German police officers) murdered 86 Poles in Sadki, out of whom 79 were identified. Victims came from Sadki, Kraczki, Radzicz and other villages in the vicinity.

In 1945, after liberation from German occupation, the exhumation of the bodies from the 2 sites began. 35 corpses that could not be identified have been buried in a mass grave at the parish cemetery of Sadki.

=== Polichno ===
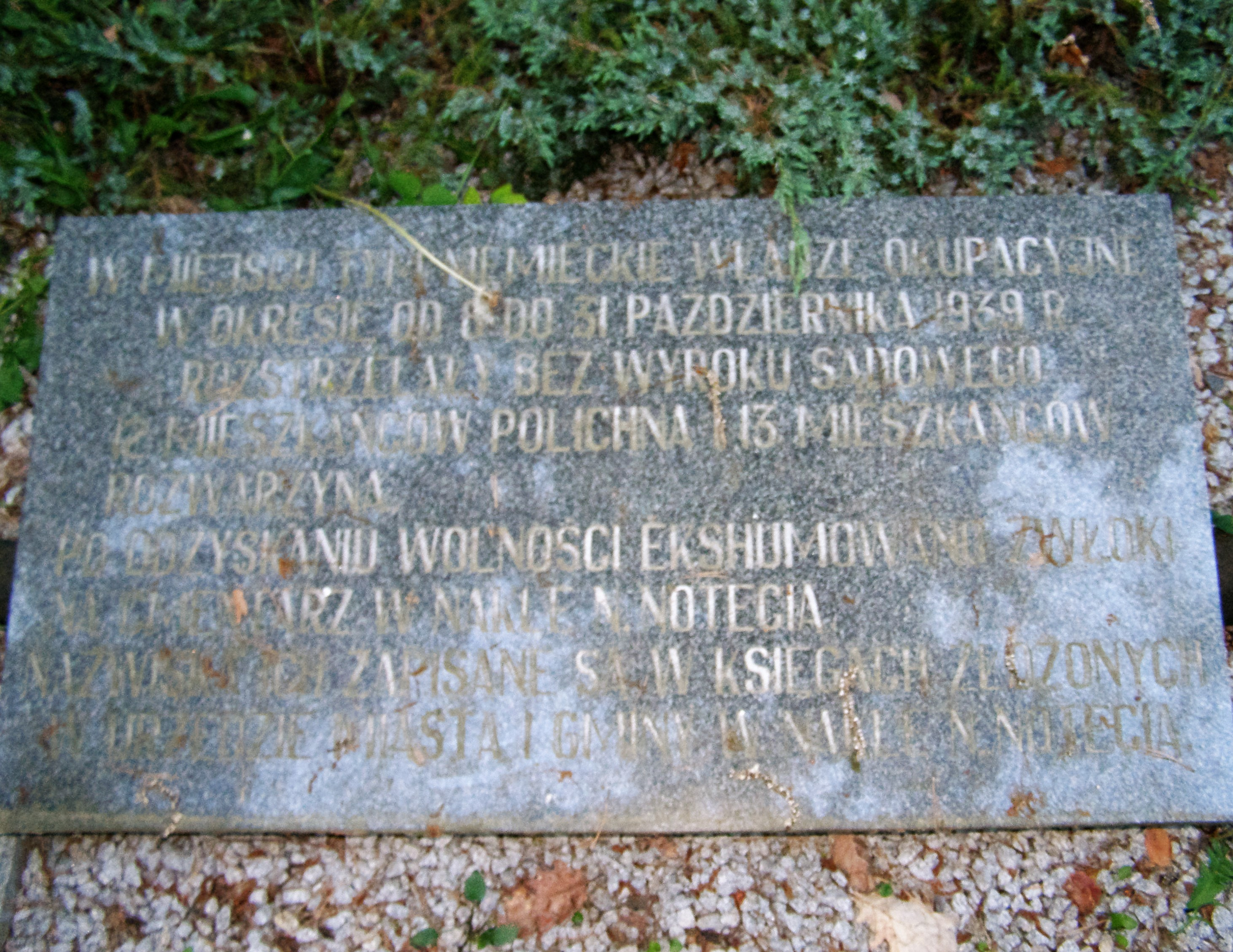
Plaque of the monument at the Polichno site

One of the most active branches of the local Volksdeutsche in Nakło nad Notecią operated in the village of Polichno. The victims were primarily Polish farmers from Polichno and Rozwarzyn: they were arrested, placed in a makeshift prison in the school building in Polichno or in a field shed, brought to the nearby forest and shot.

Between 8 and 31 October 1939, Selbstschutz militants murdered and buried in two mass graves 27 Poles. The victims included 9 residents of Polichno and 18 residents of Rozwarzyn.

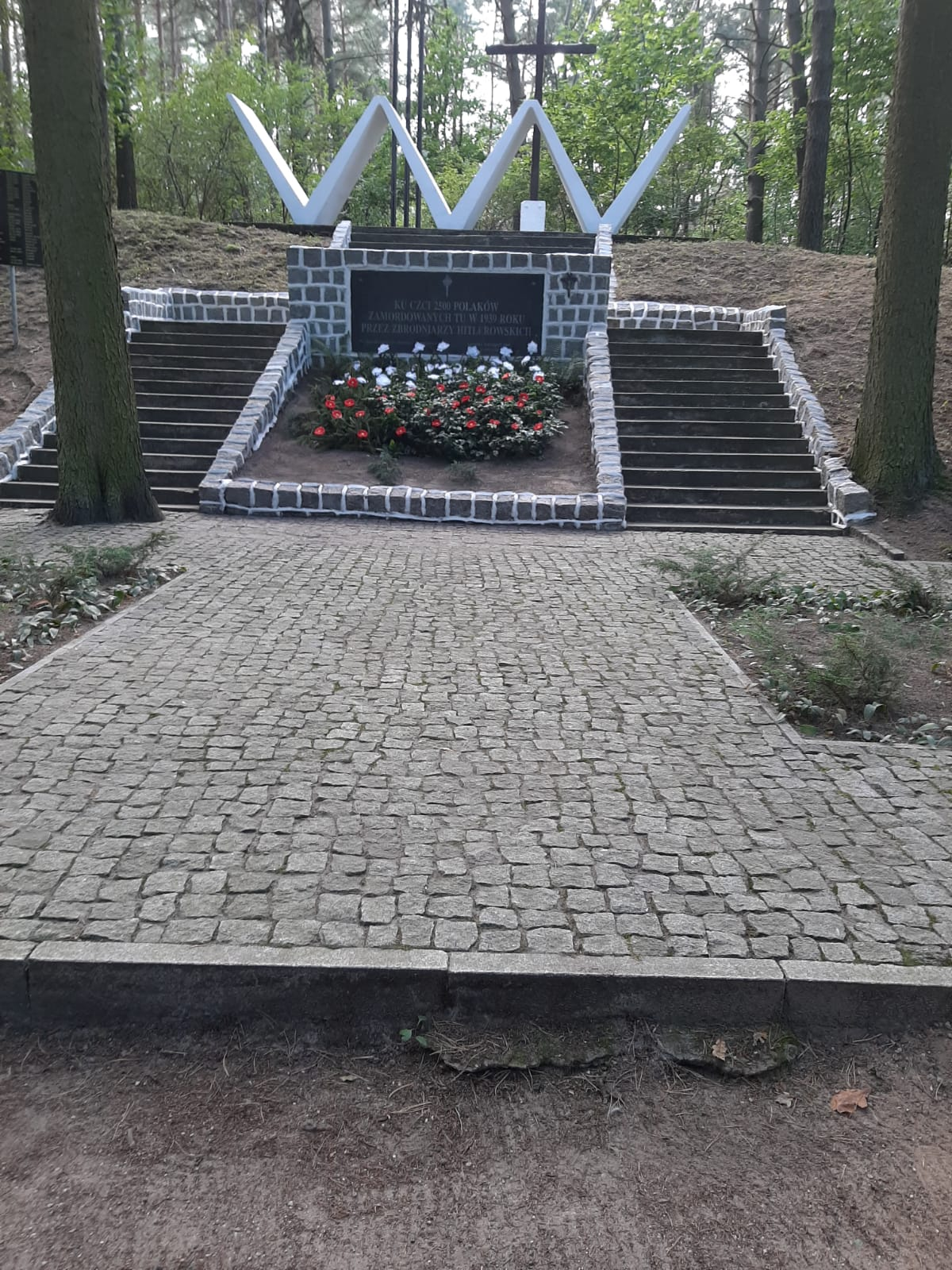
Monument of national remembrance in Łopatki

Polichno was the second largest place of execution of the Polish population in the Nakło commune after Paterek.

After the war, the bodies were exhumed and buried in the cemetery on Bohaterów Street in Nakło, where they were laid to rest in a common grave along with other exhumed victims of German repression on the Nakło commune.

=== Łopatki ===
The place of execution was an inactive sand mine located near the village of Łopatki, 11 kilometres (6.8 mi) from Wąbrzeźno. Selbstschutz started mass executions on 17 October 1939, followed regularly by others during the following six weeks.

Most of the one thousand prisoners of the Wąbrzeźno camp died in Łopatki.

At the end of 1944, Germans began to erase the traces of the crime. Bodies were dug up and burned, making it difficult to determine the exact number of victims of the crime in Łopatki.

The Polish Council for the Protection of Struggle and Martyrdom Sites (Rada Ochrony Pamięci Walk i Męczeństwa) estimates the number of victims around 2400, including Jews, women, children and several priests. It has only been possible to identify a few dozen victims, among whom were Władysław Klimek, a MP to the Sejm, and Father Alojzy Puppel, the then parish priest in Kowalewo Pomorskie.

== See also ==
- Bydgoszcz District
- Intelligenzaktion Pommern
- Aktion T4
- Stutthof concentration camp
- Sonderaktion 1005
- German atrocities committed against Soviet prisoners of war
- Polish Council for the Protection of Struggle and Martyrdom Sites

== Bibliography ==
- Bojarska, Barbara (1972). Eksterminacja inteligencji polskiej na Pomorzu Gdańskim (wrzesień-grudzień 1939) [Extermination of the Polish intelligentsia in Gdańsk Pomerania (September–December 1939).] (in Polish). Poznań: Instytut Zachodni.
- Ciechanowski, Konrad (1988). Stutthof: hitlerowski obóz koncentracyjny [Stutthof: Nazi concentration camp.] (in Polish). Warszawa: Interpress. ISBN 83-223-2369-7.
- Jankowski, Andrzej (2009). Wieś polska na ziemiach okupowanych przez Niemcy w czasie II wojny światowej w postępowaniach karnych organów wymiaru sprawiedliwości RFN. "Glaukopis" [Polish village in the territories occupied by Germany during World War II in criminal proceedings of the justice authorities of the Federal Republic of Germany. "Glaukopis".] (in Polish). Warszawa: Interpress. ISBN 978-83-223-2369-4.
- Jankowski, Andrzej (2009). Wieś polska na ziemiach okupowanych przez Niemcy w czasie II wojny światowej w postępowaniach karnych organów wymiaru sprawiedliwości RFN. "Glaukopis" [Polish village in the territories occupied by Germany during World War II in criminal proceedings of the justice authorities of the Federal Republic of Germany. "Glaukopis".] (in Polish). Warszawa: Interpress. ISBN 978-83-223-2369-4.
- Jastrzębski, Włodzimierz (1974). Terror i zbrodnia. Eksterminacja ludności polskiej i żydowskiej w rejencji bydgoskiej w latach 1939–1945 [Terror and Crime. Extermination of the Polish and Jewish Population in the Bydgoszcz Region in the Years 1939–1945] (in Polish). Warszawa: Interpress. pp. 91–95, 148–153.
- Jankowski, Andrzej; Sikora, Jerzy; Szwankowski, Jerzy; Łukasz, Trzciński (2014). Dzieje Raciąża i miejscowości sołeckich [History of Raciąż and its villages.] (in Polish). Raciąż: Stowarzyszenie Rozwoju Sołectwa Raciąż. ISBN 978-83-940310-0-8.
- Jankowski, Andrzej; Szwankowski, Jerzy (2010). Tuchola. Od pradziejów do współczesności [Tuchola. From prehistory to the present day] (in Polish). Bydgoszcz-Tuchola: Przedsiębiorstwo Marketingowe LOGO i Miejska Biblioteka Publiczna w Tucholi. ISBN 978-83-62097-15-9.
- Mazanowska, Izabela; Ceran, Tomasz (2021). Selbstschutz na Pomorzu Gdańskim i Kujawach (Selbstschutz Westpreussen). W: Izabela Mazanowska, Tomasz Ceran, Marcin Przegiętka (red.): W cieniu Einsatzgruppen. Volksdeutscher Selbstschutz w okupowanej Polsce 1939–1940. Wybrane zagadnienia [Selbstschutz in Gdańsk Pomerania and Kujawy (Selbstschutz Westpreussen). Izabela Mazanowska, Tomasz Ceran, Marcin Przegiętka In the Shadow of the Einsatzgruppen. Volksdeutscher Selbstschutz in Occupied Poland 1939–1940. Selected Issues.] (in Polish). Selbstschutz na Pomorzu Gdańskim i Kujawach (Selbstschutz Westpreussen). W: Izabela Mazanowska, Tomasz Ceran, Marcin Przegiętka (red.): W cieniu Einsatzgruppen. Volksdeutscher Selbstschutz w okupowanej Polsce 1939–1940. Wybrane zagadnienia.: Instytut Pamięci Narodowej – Komisja Ścigania Zbrodni przeciwko Narodowi Polskiemu. Oddział w Gdańsku. ISBN 978-83-8229-261-9.
- Wardzyńska, Maria (2009). Był rok 1939. Operacja niemieckiej policji bezpieczeństwa w Polsce. Intelligenzaktion [It was 1939. The German Security Police operation in Poland. Intelligenzaktion] (in Polish). Warszawa: Instytut Pamięci Narodowej. ISBN 978-83-7629-063-8.
- Kozłowski, Wacław (1987). Stulecie powiatu tucholskiego: 1875–1975. Cz. II: 1939–1945 [The centenary of the Tuchola district: 1875–1975. Part II: 1939–1945.] (in Polish). Bydgoszcz: Kujawsko-Pomorskie Towarzystwo Kulturalne. ISBN 978-83-7629-063-8.
- Milewski, Józef (1986). Miejsca Pamięci Narodowej w Borach Tucholskich (utrwalone) [Places of National Remembrance in the Tuchola Forest (preserved).] (in Polish). Skórcz: Międzygminna Komisja Organizacyjna Upamiętnienia Miejsc Walki i Męczeństwa w Borach Tucholskich.
- Schenk, Dieter (2002). Albert Forster. Gdański namiestnik Hitlera [Albert Forster. Gdański namiestnik Hitlera.] (in Polish). Gdańsk: Wydawnictwo Oskar. ISBN 83-86181-83-4.
- Skibiński, Edward (2016). Zbrodnia w Rudzkim Moście w październiku i listopadzie 1939 roku. W: Tomasz Ceran, Izabela Mazanowska (red.): Zapomniani kaci Hitlera. Volksdeutscher Selbstschutz w okupowanej Polsce 1939–1940. Wybrane zagadnienia [The crime in Rudzki Most in October and November 1939. Tomasz Ceran, Izabela Mazanowska: Hitler's forgotten executioners. Volksdeutscher Selbstschutz in occupied Poland 1939–1940. Selected issues.] (in Polish). Bydgoszcz, Gdańsk: Instytut Pamięci Narodowej – Komisja Ścigania Zbrodni przeciwko Narodowi Polskiemu. Oddział w Gdańsku. ISBN 978-83-7629-952-5.
