= Bągart =

Bągart may refer to the following places:

- Bągart, Chełmno County in Kuyavian-Pomeranian Voivodeship (north-central Poland)
- Bągart, Wąbrzeźno County in Kuyavian-Pomeranian Voivodeship (north-central Poland)
- Bągart, Pomeranian Voivodeship (north Poland)
