= Kijewo Królewskie =

- Village
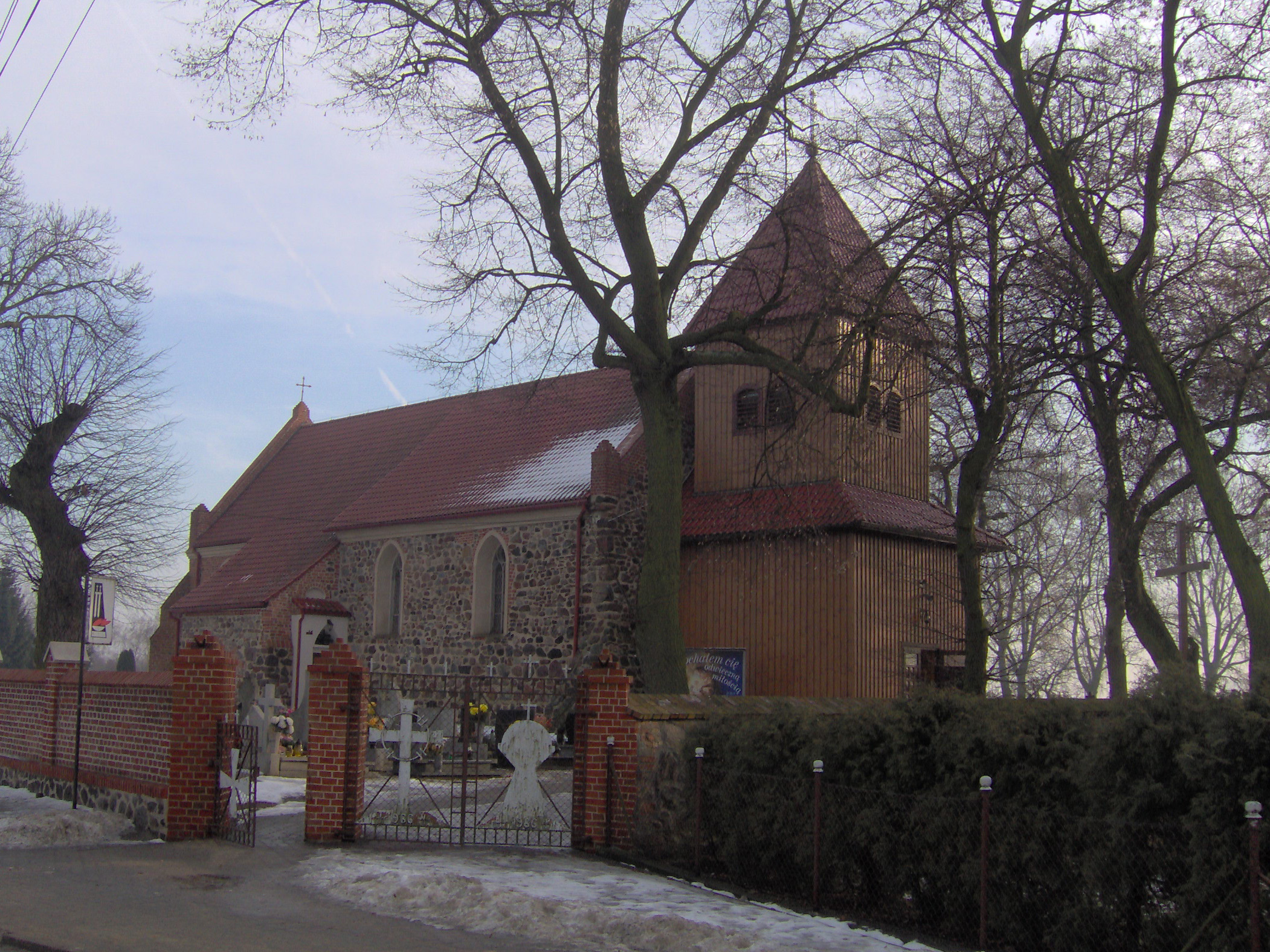
- Saint Lawrence Church

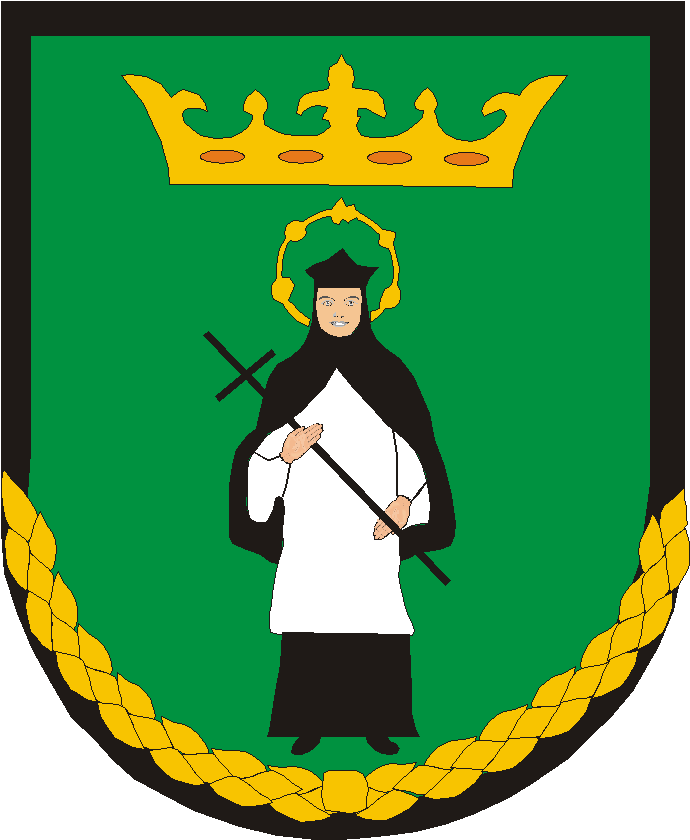
- Coat of arms

- Location within Poland
- Coordinates: 53°16′26″N 18°26′41″E
- Country: Poland
- Voivodeship: Kuyavian-Pomeranian
- County: Chełmno
- Gmina: Kijewo Królewskie
- Time zone: UTC+1 (CET)
  - Summer (DST): UTC+2 (CEST)
- Vehicle registration: CCH
- Website: http://www.kijewo.pl

Kijewo Królewskie [kiˈjɛvɔ kruˈlɛfskʲɛ], meaning "Royal Kijewo", is a village in Chełmno County, Kuyavian-Pomeranian Voivodeship, in north-central Poland. It is the seat of the gmina (administrative district) called Gmina Kijewo Królewskie. It is located in the Chełmno Land in the historic region of Pomerania.

== History ==
During the German occupation (World War II), inhabitants of Kijewo Królewskie were among the victims of a massacre of around 400 Poles committed in Małe Czyste in autumn 1939 as part of the Intelligenzaktion. In December 1939–January 1940 and in October 1941, the occupiers also carried out expulsions of Poles, whose farms were then handed over to German colonists as part of the Lebensraum policy. During the deportation to the General Government (German-occupied central Poland), three people died, a mother with two daughters aged 6 and 9.

== Sports ==
The local football club is LKS Pomowiec Kijewo Królewskie. It competes in the lower leagues.
