= Kiełp =

- Village
- Location within Poland
- Coordinates: 53°18′N 18°24′E
- Country: Poland
- Voivodeship: Kuyavian-Pomeranian
- County: Chełmno
- Gmina: Kijewo Królewskie

Kiełp [kʲɛu̯p] is a village in the administrative district of Gmina Kijewo Królewskie within Chełmno County, Kuyavian-Pomeranian Voivodeship in north-central Poland.
