= Płutowo =

- Village
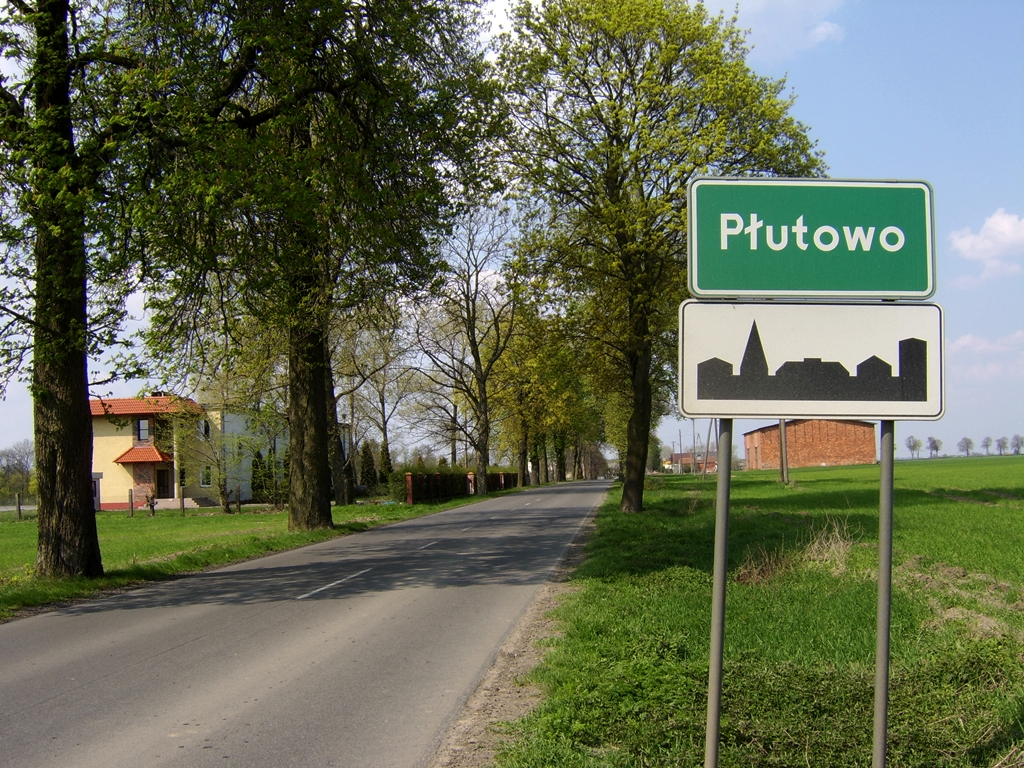

- Location within Poland
- Coordinates: 53°17′06″N 18°25′17″E
- Country: Poland
- Voivodeship: Kuyavian-Pomeranian
- County: Chełmno
- Gmina: Kijewo Królewskie

Płutowo (Polish pronunciation: [pwuˈtɔvɔ]) is a village in the administrative district of Gmina Kijewo Królewskie, within Chełmno County, Kuyavian-Pomeranian Voivodeship, in north-central Poland.

North of Płutowo village there is the Płutowo Nature Reserve with a total area of 17.96 hectares (44.4 acres), which was established in 1963 for the protection of a rare ecosystem along a ravine above the Vistula river. The length of the ravine is 1.2 km and its depth around 57 metres from the top down to the water level.

== World War II ==
In the fall of 1939 following the invasion of Poland the Nazi German occupational authorities set up a temporary concentration camp in Płutowo at a manor once owned by von Alvensleben family. The Polish prisoners brought to the camp came from the area of Ziemia chełmińska (Chełmno land). Over 200 victims were murdered at a nearby forest by the German Volksdeutscher Selbstschutz executioners, along the road to Szymborno.
