= Małe Czyste =

- Village
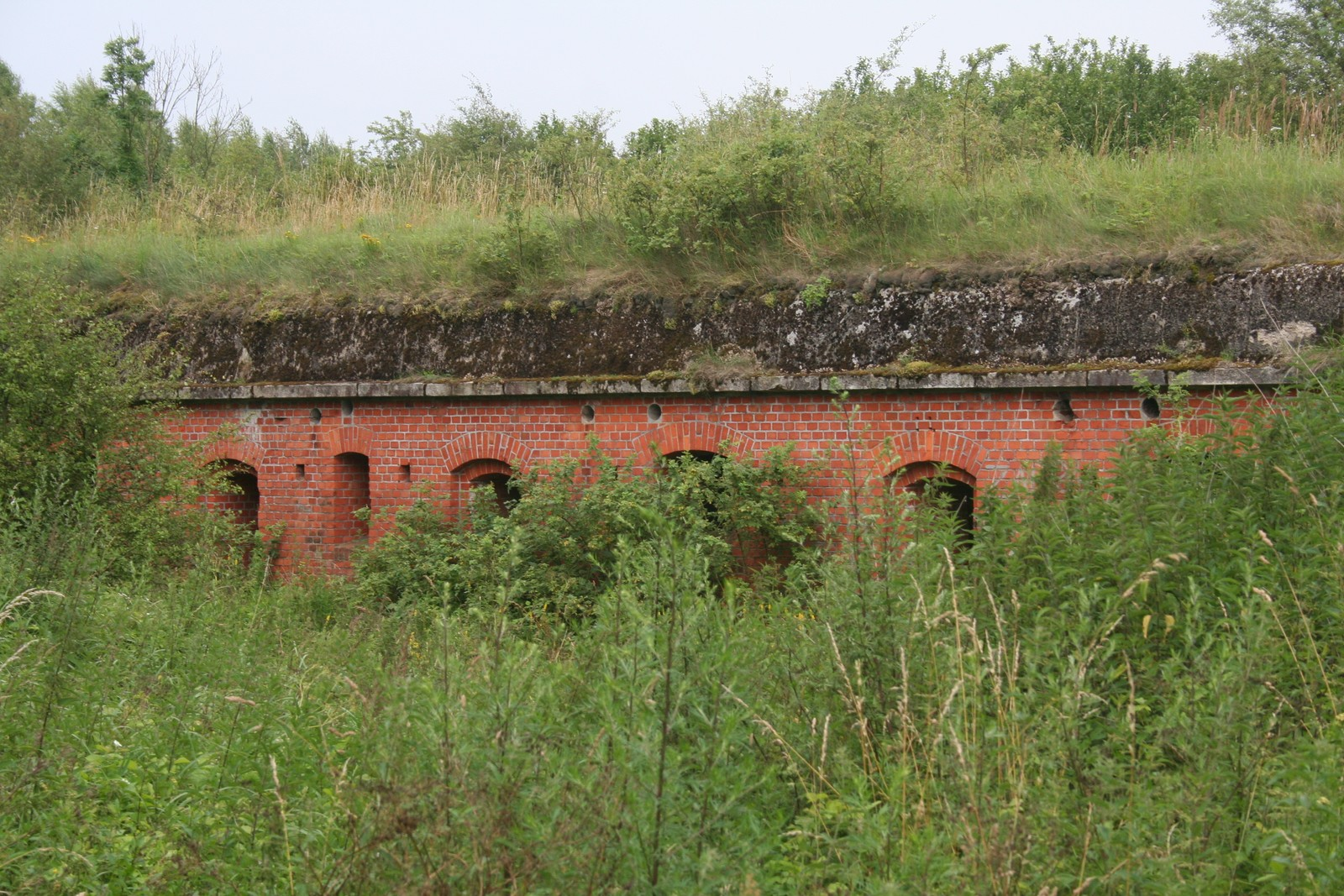
- Infantry bunker UR-2 in Małe Czyste

- Location within Poland
- Coordinates: 53°18′9″N 18°29′11″E
- Country: Poland
- Voivodeship: Kuyavian-Pomeranian
- County: Chełmno
- Gmina: Stolno
- Time zone: UTC+1 (CET)
  - Summer (DST): UTC+2 (CEST)
- Vehicle registration: CCH

Małe Czyste [ˈmawɛ ˈt͡ʂɨstɛ] is a village in the administrative district of Gmina Stolno, within Chełmno County, Kuyavian-Pomeranian Voivodeship, in north-central Poland. It is located in the Chełmno Land in the historic region of Pomerania.

There are several bunkers from World War I in the village.

== History ==
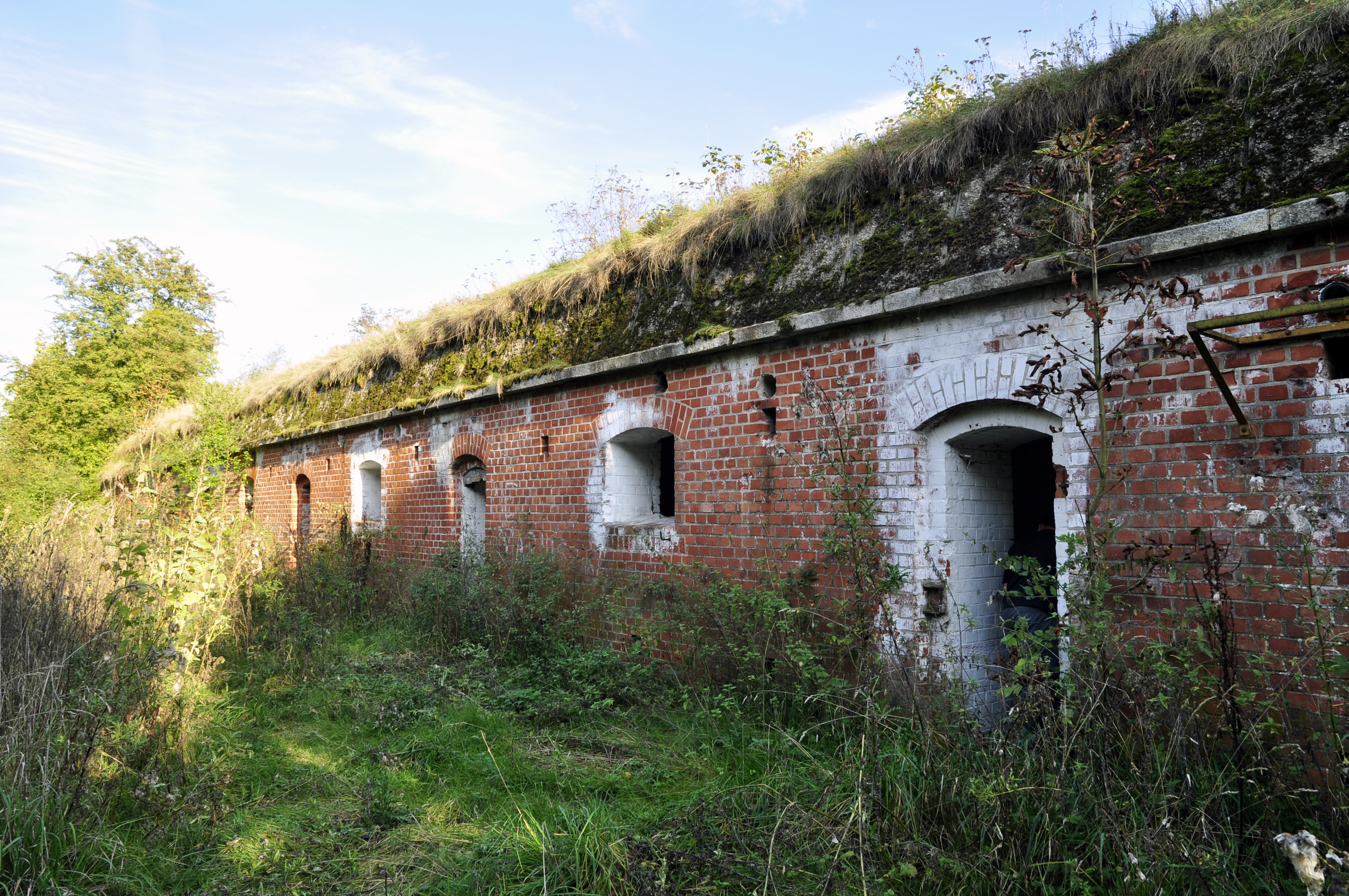
Fort IV

During the German occupation (World War II), Małe Czyste was the site of massacres of around 400 Poles from the region, carried out by the Germans in 1939 as part of the Intelligenzaktion. The Poles were previously held in a German Selbstschutz jail in the nearby village of Dorposz Szlachecki. Among the victims were 21 farmers from Małe Czyste. The Germans burned the bodies of the victims to cover up the crime.
