= Bajerze =

- Village
- Location within Poland
- Coordinates: 53°15′N 18°27′E
- Country: Poland
- Voivodeship: Kuyavian-Pomeranian
- County: Chełmno
- Gmina: Kijewo Królewskie

Bajerze [baˈjɛʐɛ] is a village in the administrative district of Gmina Kijewo Królewskie, within Chełmno County, Kuyavian-Pomeranian Voivodeship, in north-central Poland.
