= Kijewo Szlacheckie =

- Village
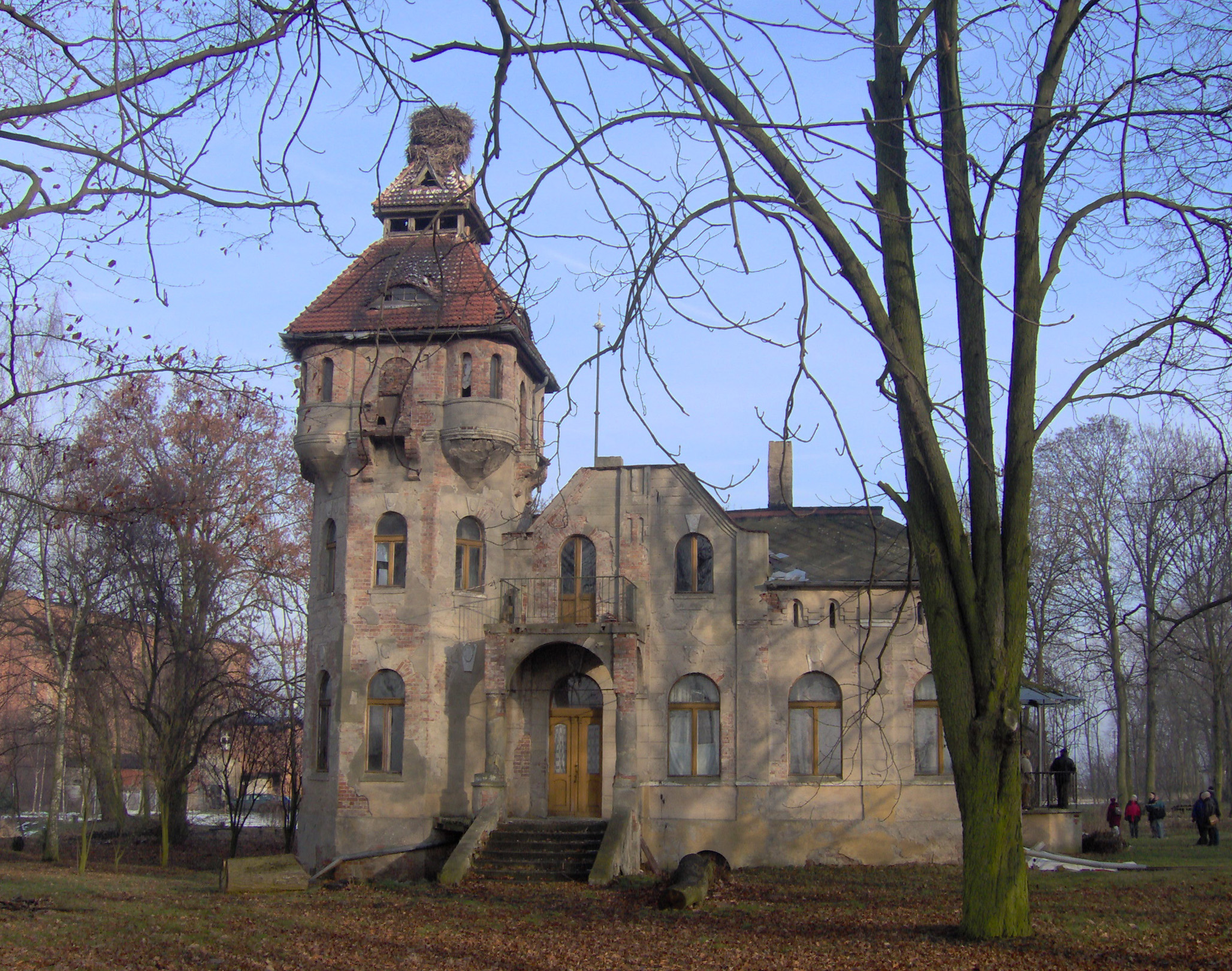
- Palace from 1908

- Location within Poland
- Coordinates: 53°16′N 18°25′E
- Country: Poland
- Voivodeship: Kuyavian-Pomeranian
- County: Chełmno
- Gmina: Kijewo Królewskie

Kijewo Szlacheckie [kiˈjɛvɔ ʂlaˈxɛt͡skʲɛ] is a village in the administrative district of Gmina Kijewo Królewskie, within Chełmno County, Kuyavian-Pomeranian Voivodeship, in north-central Poland.
