= Trzebcz Szlachecki =

- Village
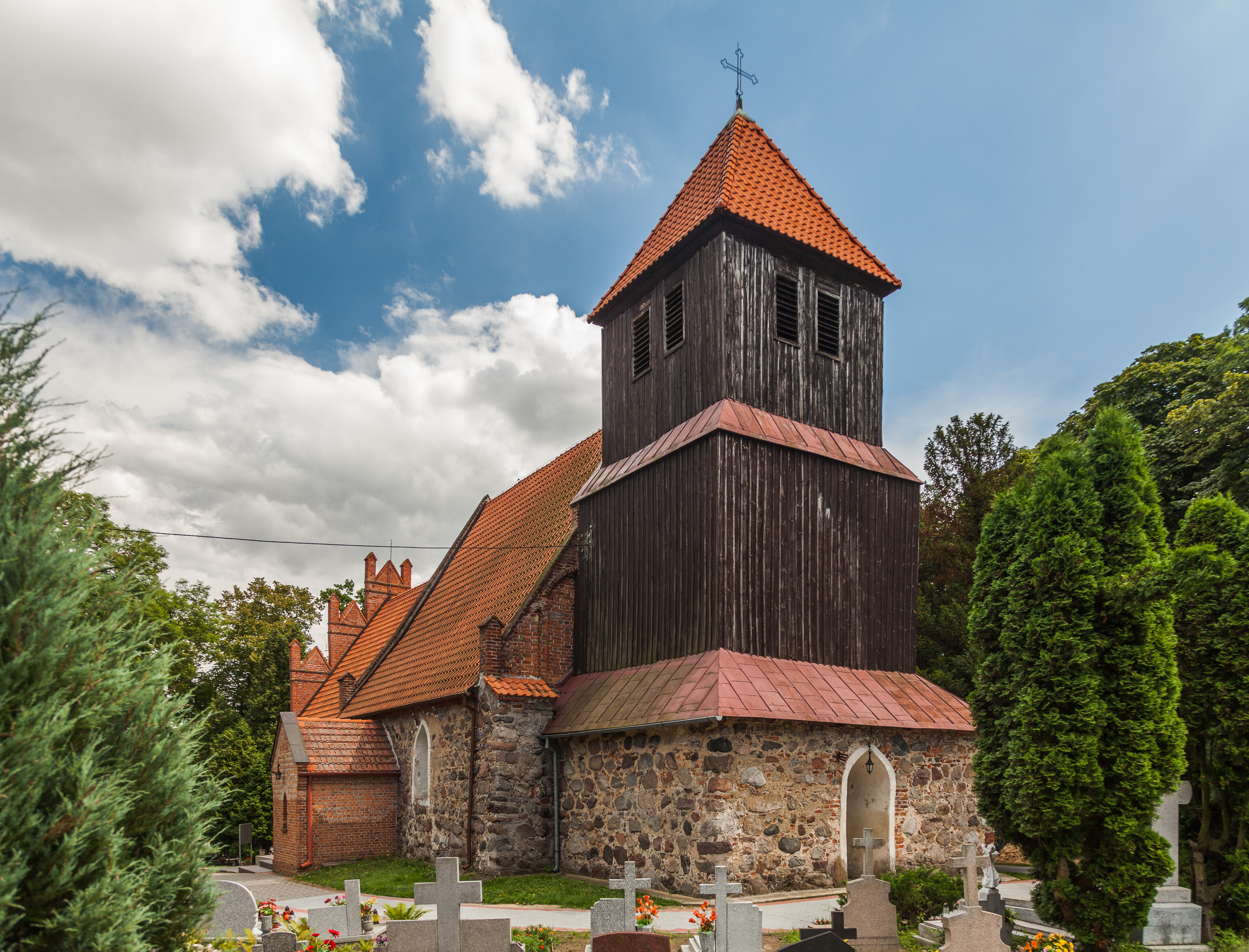
- Church of the Assumption of the Virgin Mary

- Location within Poland
- Coordinates: 53°13′N 18°29′E
- Country: Poland
- Voivodeship: Kuyavian-Pomeranian
- County: Chełmno
- Gmina: Kijewo Królewskie

Trzebcz Szlachecki (Polish pronunciation: [ˈtʂɛptʂ ʂlaˈxɛtskʲi]) is a village in the administrative district of Gmina Kijewo Królewskie, within Chełmno County, Kuyavian-Pomeranian Voivodeship, in north-central Poland.
