= Gmina Kijewo Królewskie =

Gmina Kijewo Królewskie Kijewo Królewskie Commune
- Gmina
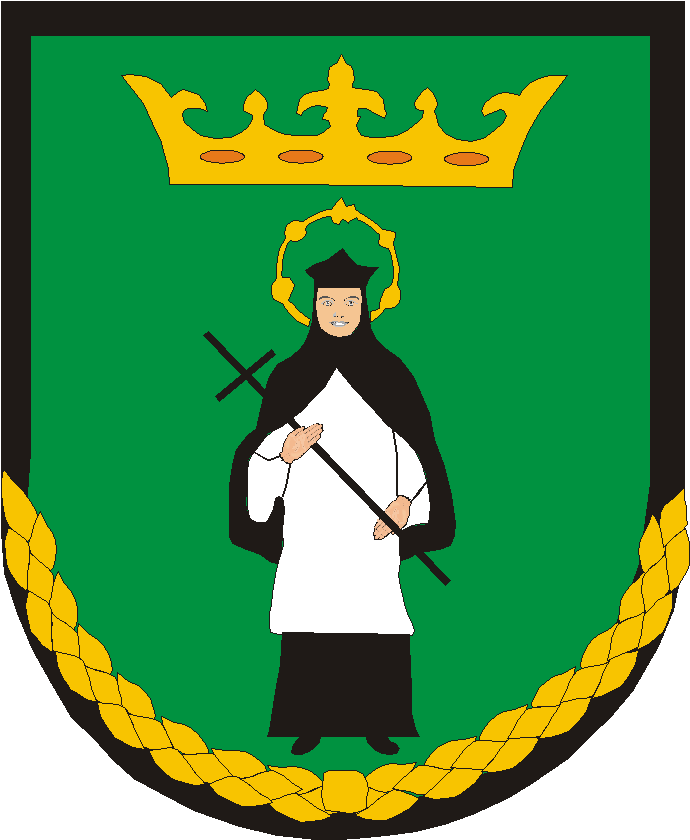
- Coat of arms
- Interactive map of Gmina Kijewo Królewskie
- Coordinates (Kijewo Królewskie): 53°16′26″N 18°26′41″E
- Country: Poland
- Voivodeship: Kuyavian-Pomeranian
- County: Chełmno
- Seat: Kijewo Królewskie

Area
  - Total: 72.19 km^{2} (27.87 sq mi)

Population (2006)
  - Total: 4,294
  - Density: 59.48/km^{2} (154.1/sq mi)
- Website: http://www.kijewo.pl

Gmina Kijewo Królewskie is a rural gmina (administrative district) in Chełmno County, Kuyavian-Pomeranian Voivodeship, in north-central Poland. Its seat is the village of Kijewo Królewskie, which lies approximately 11 kilometres (7 mi) south of Chełmno, 30 km (19 mi) north-west of Toruń, and 35 km (22 mi) north-east of Bydgoszcz.

The gmina covers an area of 72.19 square kilometres (27.9 sq mi), and as of 2006 its total population is 4,294.

== Villages ==
Gmina Kijewo Królewskie contains the villages and settlements of Bągart, Bajerze, Brzozowo, Dorposz Szlachecki, Kiełp, Kijewo Królewskie, Kijewo Szlacheckie, Płutowo, Szymborno, Trzebcz Królewski, Trzebcz Szlachecki and Watorowo.

== Neighbouring gminas ==
Gmina Kijewo Królewskie is bordered by the town of Chełmno and by the gminas of Chełmno, Chełmża, Łubianka, Papowo Biskupie, Stolno and Unisław.
