= Bągart, Chełmno County =

Bągart
- Village
- Location within Poland
- Coordinates: 53°15′N 18°26′E
- Country: Poland
- Voivodeship: Kuyavian-Pomeranian
- County: Chełmno
- Gmina: Kijewo Królewskie
- Time zone: UTC+1 (CET)
  - Summer (DST): UTC+2 (CEST)
- Vehicle registration: CCH

Bągart [ˈbɔŋɡart] is a village in the administrative district of Gmina Kijewo Królewskie, within Chełmno County, Kuyavian-Pomeranian Voivodeship, in north-central Poland. It is located in Chełmno Land within the historic region of Pomerania.

== History ==
During the German occupation of Poland (World War II), Bągart was one of the sites of executions of Poles, carried out by the Germans in 1939 as part of the Intelligenzaktion.
