= Dorposz Szlachecki =

- Village
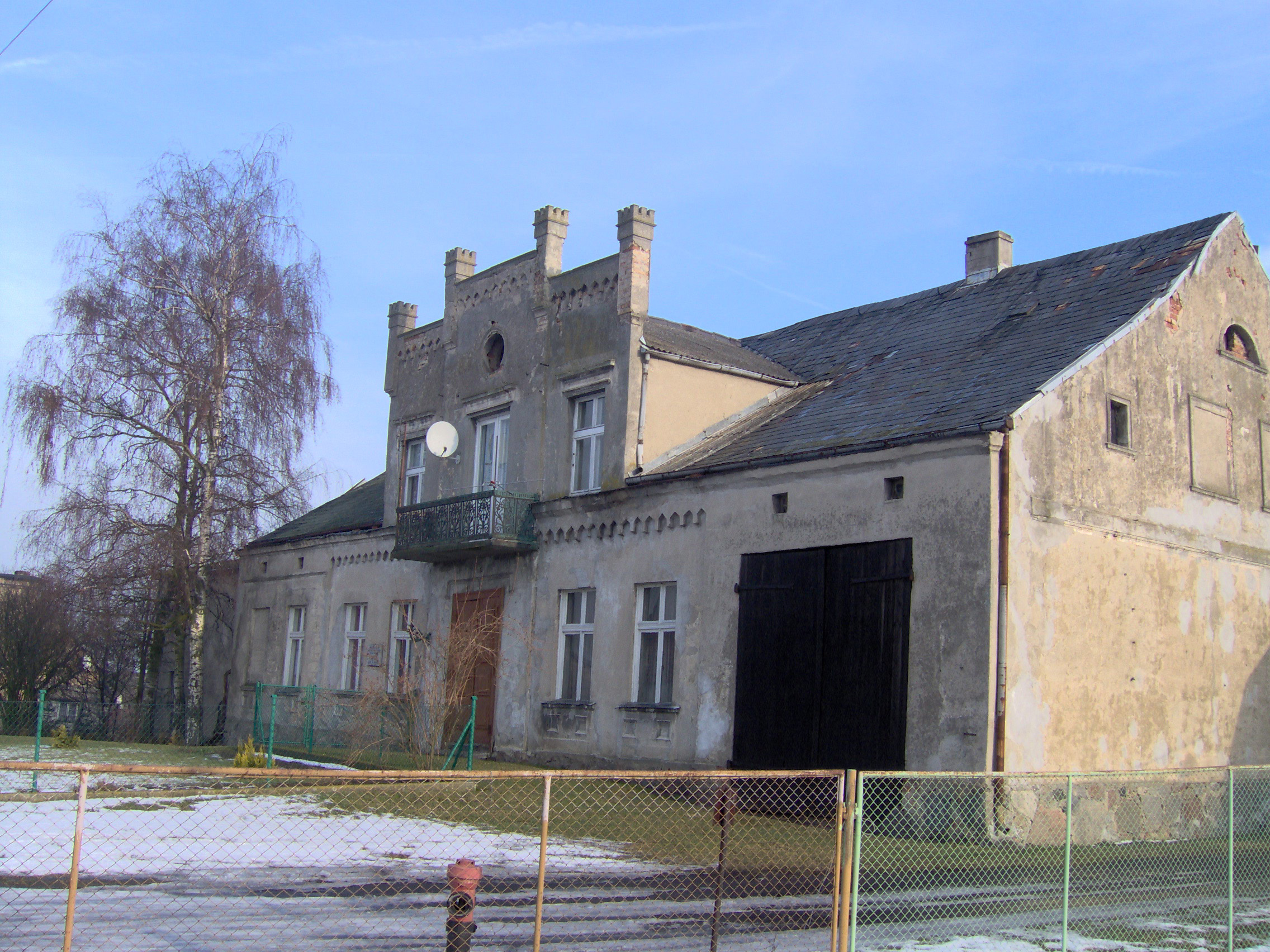
- Old manor house in Dorposz Szlachecki

- Location within Poland
- Coordinates: 53°17′27″N 18°25′55″E
- Country: Poland
- Voivodeship: Kuyavian-Pomeranian
- County: Chełmno
- Gmina: Kijewo Królewskie
- Time zone: UTC+1 (CET)
  - Summer (DST): UTC+2 (CEST)
- Vehicle registration: CCH

Dorposz Szlachecki (Polish pronunciation: [ˈdɔrpɔʂ ʂlaˈxɛtskʲi]) is a village in the administrative district of Gmina Kijewo Królewskie, within Chełmno County, Kuyavian-Pomeranian Voivodeship, in north-central Poland. It is located in the Chełmno Land in the historic region of Pomerania.

== History ==
During the German occupation (World War II), in 1939, the German Selbstschutz established a jail for Poles from the region in the local pre-war Polish police station. Around 400 Poles were imprisoned and then massacred in nearby Małe Czyste as part of the Intelligenzaktion. Polish teachers from Dorposz Szlachecki were murdered by the Germans in a massacre of Poles committed in nearby Klamry, also as part of the Intelligenzaktion. In 1941, the occupiers also carried out expulsions of Poles, whose farms were then handed over to German colonists as part of the Lebensraum policy.
