= Brzozowo, Kuyavian-Pomeranian Voivodeship =

Brzozowo
- Village
- Location within Poland
- Coordinates: 53°19′N 18°26′E
- Country: Poland
- Voivodeship: Kuyavian-Pomeranian
- County: Chełmno
- Gmina: Kijewo Królewskie
- Time zone: UTC+1 (CET)
  - Summer (DST): UTC+2 (CEST)
- Vehicle registration: CCH

Brzozowo [bʐɔˈzɔvɔ] is a village in the administrative district of Gmina Kijewo Królewskie, within Chełmno County, Kuyavian-Pomeranian Voivodeship, in north-central Poland. It is located in the Chełmno Land in the historic region of Pomerania.

== History ==
During the German occupation (World War II), in 1939, local Polish teachers were murdered by the Germans in a massacre of Poles committed in nearby Klamry as part of the Intelligenzaktion, while the sołtys of Brzozowo (head of local administration) Władysław Kroning was among Poles massacred by the Germans on October 5–6, 1939 in the Barbarka forest within today's city limits of Toruń.
