= Selbstschutz =

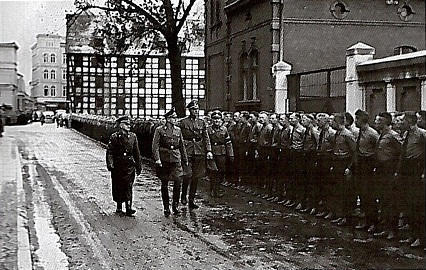
- Inspection of Selbstschutz unit in Bydgoszcz (in German, Bromberg), Poland. From l. to r.: Josef "Bloody" Meier, leader of Selbstschutz in Bydgoszcz; Werner Kampe, new SS mayor of Bydgoszcz; and Ludolf von Alvensleben, leader of Selbstschutz in Pomerania
- Country: Central and Eastern Europe: Poland, Czechoslovakia, Yugoslavia and the Soviet Union
- Allegiance: Post-WWI (in Ukraine): Imperial Germany / Russian Volunteer Army; WWII: Nazi Germany/the SS
- Type: Militia, Paramilitary police reserve or civil defense organization

Selbstschutz (German for "self-protection") is the name given to different iterations of ethnic German self-protection units formed both after World War I and in the lead-up to World War II.

The first incarnation of the Selbstschutz was a German paramilitary organisation formed after World War I for ethnic Germans who lived outside Germany in the territories occupied by Germany and Austria-Hungary following the conclusion of the Treaty of Brest-Litovsk. The purpose of these units was to protect local ethnically German communities and, indirectly, to serve German security interests in southern Ukraine. Another iteration of the Selbstschutz concept was established in Silesia and aimed at returning Polish-inhabited territories back to Germany following the proclamation of the Second Polish Republic. In 1921, units of Selbstschutz took part in the fighting against the Polish Third Silesian Uprising.

The third incarnation operated in territories of Central and Eastern Europe before and after the beginning of World War II, notably in Poland, the Free City of Danzig, Czechoslovakia, Yugoslavia and the Soviet Union. This Selbstschutz organization took on the character of the Nazi era in which it was conceived and organized.

In 1938, a campaign was started by local Selbstschutz Sudetendeutsches Freikorps in the Czechoslovak Sudetenland in order to subjugate the local Czechs prior to the Munich Conference. During the Invasion of Poland of 1939, a number of similar units conducted sabotage actions directed by emissaries trained in Nazi Germany. These groups were officially merged into one organization, the ethnic German Volksdeutscher Selbstschutz of more than 100,000 men. They took part in fighting the Poles as the Fifth Column, but also served as auxiliary forces of the Gestapo, SS and SD during the early stages of the occupation of Poland, and helped the Nazi administration in the newly-formed Reichsgau Danzig-West Prussia and Reichsgau Wartheland. They served as local controllers, informers, and members of execution squads particularly active in the wave of mass murders of Polish intelligentsia during Operation Tannenberg and other atrocities. The killings of Poles and Jews ascribed specifically to members of Volksdeutsche Selbstschutz are estimated at a minimum of 10,000 men, women and children. The force was disbanded in winter 1939–1940 and the majority of its members joined the German SS or Gestapo by spring of the following year.

== Post-First World War Mennonite units ==
After the occupation of Ukraine by German and Austro-Hungarian forces in 1918, the German occupying authorities assisted in establishing Selbstschutz units drawn from the numerous ethnic-German communities in southern Ukraine. The Selbstschutz assisted in serving German security interests in Ukraine following the Treaty of Brest-Litovsk. Russian Mennonite men were included in this program and members were drawn from the Molotschna and Chortitza Mennonite colonies with training and armaments provided by the German imperial army. Before the end of the occupation, German soldiers supervised the creation of several Selbstschutz units, leaving weapons, ammunition, and a few officers to command the groups. Together with a neighboring Lutheran German colony, the young men from Molotschna formed twenty companies totaling 2,700 infantry and 300 cavalry. During the Russian Civil War, these forces were initially successful in holding back the forces of anarchist Nestor Makhno until March 1919. However, the self-defense groups were ultimately overwhelmed and forced to retreat and disband when Makhno's partisans allied with and were reinforced by, the Red Army. As the Russian Civil War progressed, some Mennonites were integrated within ethnic battalions of the Russian Volunteer Army.

The attempt to defend the villages departed from the traditional Mennonite teaching of nonresistance and was disapproved of by many colonists. Others regarded the collapse of effective governmental authority as sufficient justification for the creation of self-defense units. This sentiment was reinforced by horrific atrocities committed by anarchist bands against Mennonite communities.

While Selbstschutz units had some success in protecting Mennonite communities from further atrocities and in providing time for the civil population to flee to areas held by White Russian forces, the abandonment of nonresistance proved to be highly divisive. Some believed that the self-defense actions may have inflamed anarchist atrocities committed against Mennonite civilians. As a result, later church conferences and delegations officially condemned the self-defense measures as a "grave mistake".

== Silesia and Poland ==
Selbstschutz militia were also active in Silesia on the German side of the Polish/German conflicts in the area. In 1921, its organized units resisted the Polish rebellion in the Third Silesian Uprising, which was aimed at seceding Upper Silesia from Germany.

== World War II ==
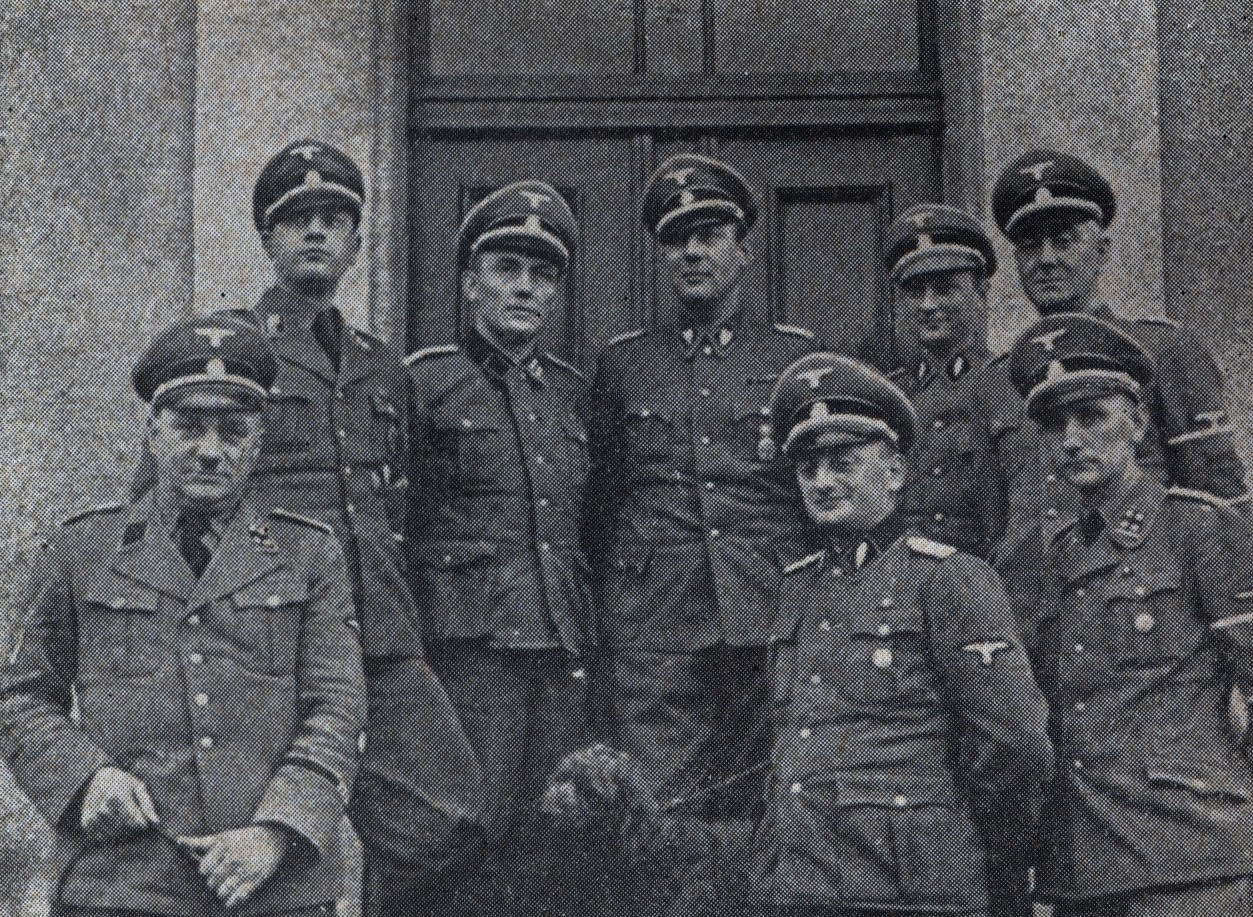
Selbstschutz chiefs ready for SS-Aktionen in Gdańsk Pomerania

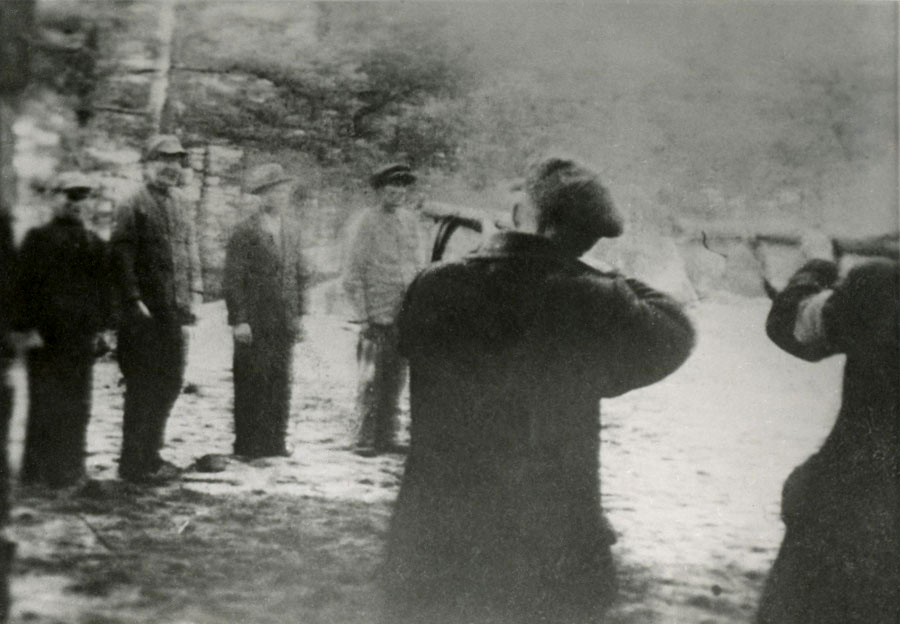
An execution carried out by the Selbstschutz in Piaśnica

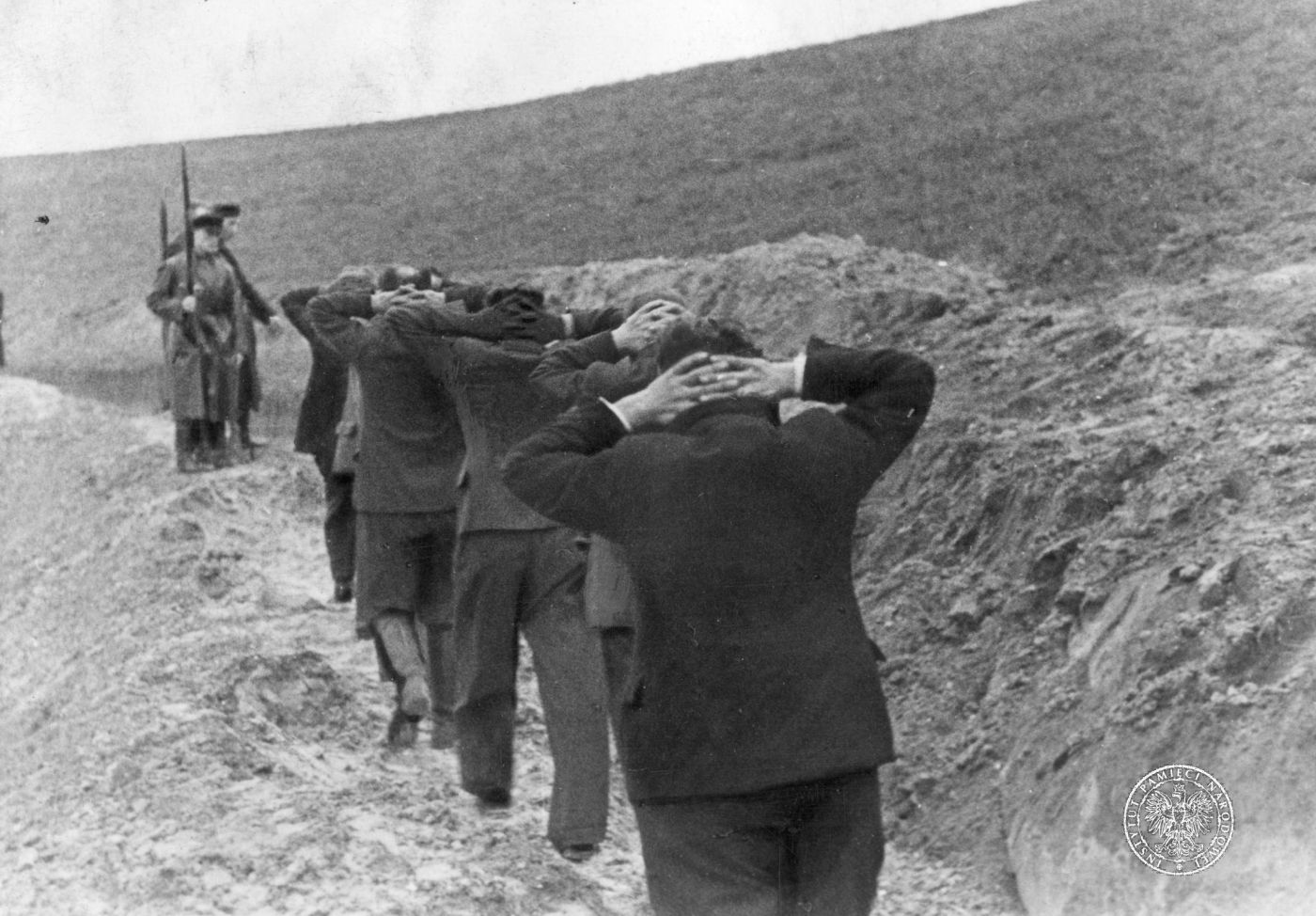
Members of the Selbstschutz leading Polish teachers to execution in the Valley of Death near Bydgoszcz

The Selbstschutz were reintroduced during the late 1930s in Poland and Czechoslovakia. The Selbstschutz Sudetendeutsches Freikorps activists worked to indoctrinate ethnic Germans locally and commit acts of terrorism against the Czech population in the Sudetenland.

In the interwar period, the German minority organizations in Poland included Jungdeutsche Partei (Young German party), Deutsche Vereinigung (German Union), Deutscher Volksbund (German peoples Union) and Deutscher Volksverband (German peoples United). All of them actively cooperated with Nazi Germany in anti-Polish espionage, sabotage, provocations, and political indoctrination. They maintained close contact with and were directed by the NSDAP (Nazi Party), Auslandsorganisation (Foreign Affairs Organization), Gestapo (Secret Police), SD (Security Service) and Abwehr (Defense).

By October 1938, SD agents were organizing the Selbstschutz in Poland. Ethnic Germans with Polish citizenship were trained in the Third Reich in various sabotage methods and guerilla tactics. Even before the war, Selbstschutz activists from Poland helped to organize lists of Poles who later were to be arrested or executed in Operation Tannenberg.

With the beginning of the Invasion of Poland on 1 September 1939, Selbstschutz units engaged in hostilities towards the Polish population and military, and performed sabotage operations helping the German attack on the Polish state. In mid-September, the chaotic and autonomous activities of this organization were coordinated by SS officers. Himmler placed Gustav Berger, a police official from Offenbach, in charge of the organization and district commanders in occupied zones made by the German army were put in place — West Prussia, Upper Silesia and Warthegau.

While the SS leadership was limited to overseeing the operations, local units remained under the control of ethnic Germans who had proven their commitment at the beginning of the war.

=== Participation in war crimes ===
The Selbstschutz set up locations for massacres of interned Poles. At times, they were organized in places where the Wehrmacht and Ordnungspolizei already established concentration camps. There were 19 such locations recorded in the following Polish cities: Bydgoszcz (see Bromberg-Ost), Brodnica (renamed Strasburg), Chełmno (see Chełmno extermination camp), Dorposz Szlachecki, Kamień Krajeński, Karolewo, Lipno (renamed Lippe), Łobżenica, Nakło (Nakel), Nowy Wiec near Skarszew, Nowe on the Vistula, Piastoszyn, Płutowo, Sępólno Krajeńskie, Solec Kujawski (Schulitz), Tuchola (Tuchel), Wąbrzeźno (Briesen), Wolental near Skórcz, and Wyrzysk (Wirsitz). The majority of the arrested Poles – men, women and youth – were murdered on the spot by Selbstschutz executioners.

People shot were finished off by blows delivered by shovels and the butts of assault rifles; they were buried in mass graves when still alive. Mothers were forced to place their children in the pits where they were shot together. Before executions women and girls were raped.(...) [The atrocities] evoked horror even in the Germans, including some soldiers. Terrified at what they saw in the town of Świecie two of them felt compelled to submit a report (now in German federal archives).

After the German invasion of Poland, the Selbstschutz worked together with the Einsatzgruppen in the mass murder of ethnic Poles. For example, they took part in the massacres in Piaśnica, the first elimination "aktion" of Polish intelligentsia. Between 12,000 and 16,000 civilians were murdered there. The Intelligenzaktion was aimed at eliminating Poland's leadership in the country. The murder operations began soon after the attack on Poland and lasted from the fall of 1939 until the spring of 1940. As the result of Nazi genocidal policy, in 10 regional actions 60,000 Polish teachers, entrepreneurs, landowners, social workers, military veterans, members of national organisations, priests, judges, and political activists were killed. The Intelligenzaktion was continued by the German AB-Aktion operation in Poland.

In West Prussia, the Selbstschutz organization led by SS-Gruppenführer Ludolf von Alvensleben was 17,667 men strong, and by 5 October 1939 had already executed 4,247 Poles. Notably, Alvensleben complained to the Selbstschutz officers that too few Poles had been shot. German officers had reported to him that only a fraction of Poles had been "destroyed" in the region, with the total number of those executed in West Prussia during this action being about 20,000. One Selbstschutz commander, Wilhelm Richardt, said in Karolewo (Karlhof) that he did not want to build big camps for Poles and feed them, and that it was an honour for Poles to fertilize the German soil with their corpses. There was visible enthusiasm for activities of the Selbstschutz among those involved in the action. Only in one case a Selbstschutz commander was relieved of duty after failing to finish his job with "only" 300 Poles executed.

The total number of Selbstschutz members in Poland is estimated by historians at 82,000. The organization was ordered to be dissolved on 26 November 1939 in favour of service with the SS, yet the work continued until the spring of 1940. Among the reasons for dissolution were the Selbstschutz's extreme corruption, disorderly behaviour and conflicts with other organizations, as well as excessive use of force.

The existence of a large paramilitary organization of ethnic Germans with Polish citizenship who engaged in widespread massacres of ethnic Poles in the course of the German war against Poland was one of the reasons for the expulsion of Germans after the war. A description of the Selbstschutz's involvement, made available by the Polish State Museum in Sztutowo, contains material compiled three years before the war broke out, for the Nazi authorities to use in extermination of the Poles thereafter.

== See also ==
- Polish Military Organisation (Polska Organizacja Wojskowa)
- Fifth column
- Operation Tannenberg
- World War II atrocities in Poland
