= Nowawieś Chełmińska =

- Village
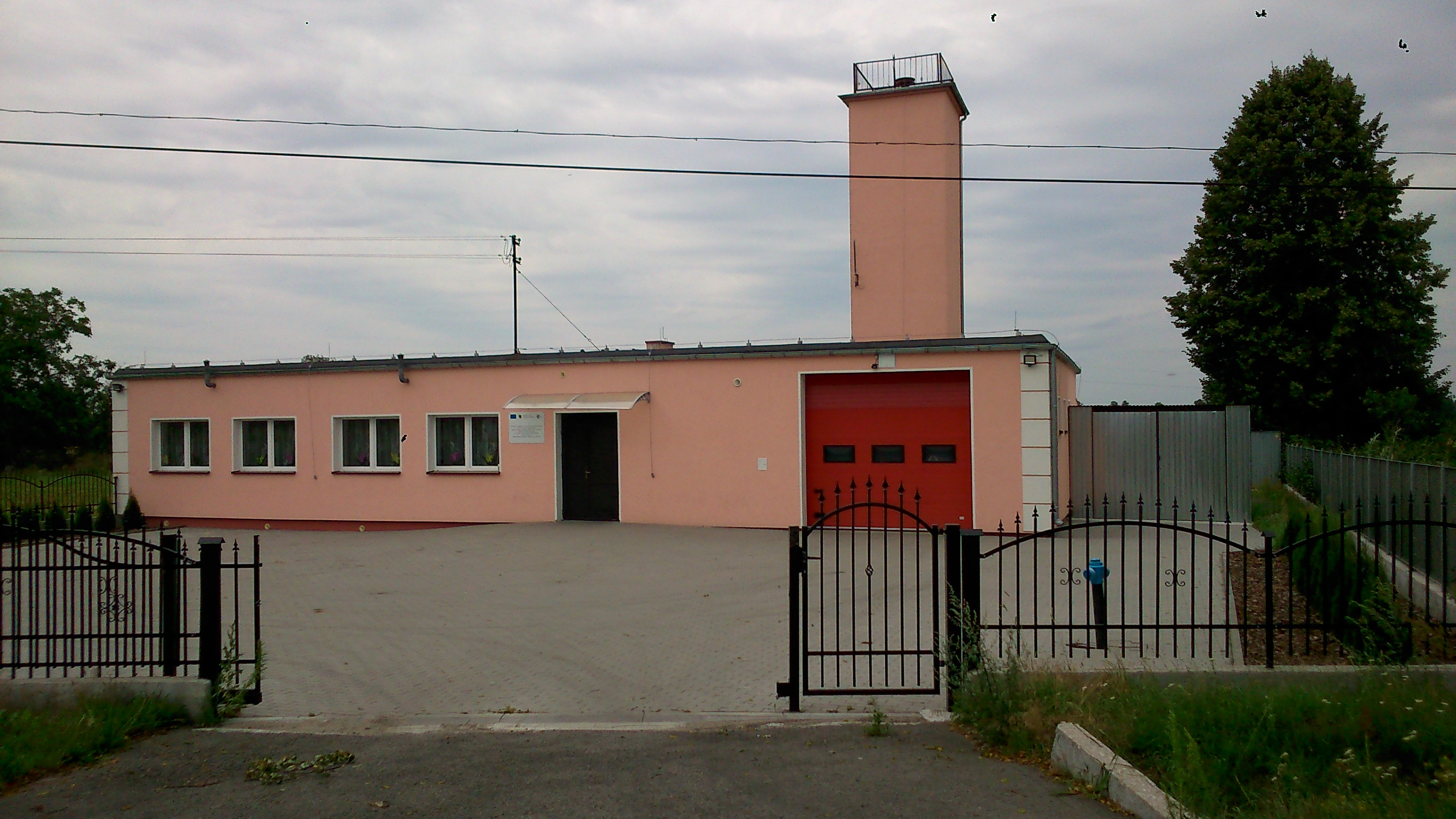
- Volunteer fire department in Nowawieś Chełmińska

- Location within Poland
- Coordinates: 53°22′16″N 18°33′30″E
- Country: Poland
- Voivodeship: Kuyavian-Pomeranian
- County: Chełmno
- Gmina: Chełmno
- Population: 180
- Time zone: UTC+1 (CET)
  - Summer (DST): UTC+2 (CEST)
- Vehicle registration: CCH

Nowawieś Chełmińska [nɔˈvavjɛɕ xɛu̯ˈmiɲska] is a village in the administrative district of Gmina Chełmno, within Chełmno County, Kuyavian-Pomeranian Voivodeship, in north-central Poland. It is located in the Chełmno Land in the historic region of Pomerania.

== History ==
During the German occupation (World War II), in 1939, local Polish teachers and farmers were murdered by the Germans in a massacre of Poles committed in nearby Klamry as part of the Intelligenzaktion.
