= Chełmiński =

Chełmiński may refer to:

Jan Chełmiński (1851–1925), a Polish historical painter

Locality in Poland

- Radzyń Chełmiński, a town in Grudziądz County
- Dorposz Chełmiński, a village in Gmina Chełmno within Chełmno County
- Powiat Chełmiński, the Polish language toponym for the Chełmno County
