= Bieńkówka, Kuyavian-Pomeranian Voivodeship =

Bieńkówka
- Village
- Location within Poland
- Coordinates: 53°19′00″N 18°21′00″E
- Country: Poland
- Voivodeship: Kuyavian-Pomeranian
- County: Chełmno
- Gmina: Chełmno
- Time zone: UTC+1 (CET)
  - Summer (DST): UTC+2 (CEST)
- Vehicle registration: CCH

Bieńkówka [bjɛɲˈkufka] is a village in the administrative district of Gmina Chełmno, within Chełmno County, Kuyavian-Pomeranian Voivodeship, in north-central Poland, on the right bank of the Vistula river. It is located in the Chełmno Land in the historic region of Pomerania.

== History ==
Bieńkówka was a private church village, administratively located in the Chełmno Voivodeship of the Kingdom of Poland.

During the German occupation (World War II), in 1939, local Polish teachers were murdered by the Germans in a massacre of Poles committed in nearby Klamry as part of the Intelligenzaktion. In 1941, the occupiers also carried out expulsions of Poles, whose farms were then handed over to German colonists as part of the Lebensraum policy.
