= Nowe Dobra, Chełmno County =

Nowe Dobra
- Village
- Location within Poland
- Coordinates: 53°23′N 18°28′E
- Country: Poland
- Voivodeship: Kuyavian-Pomeranian
- County: Chełmno
- Gmina: Chełmno
- Time zone: UTC+1 (CET)
  - Summer (DST): UTC+2 (CEST)
- Vehicle registration: CCH

Nowe Dobra [ˈnɔvɛ ˈdɔbra] is a village in the administrative district of Gmina Chełmno, within Chełmno County, Kuyavian-Pomeranian Voivodeship, in north-central Poland. It is located in Chełmno Land within the historic region of Pomerania.

== History ==
During the German occupation of Poland (World War II), Nowe Dobra was one of the sites of executions of Poles, carried out by the Germans in 1939 as part of the Intelligenzaktion.

== Notable residents ==
- Antoni Grabowski (1857–1921), chemical engineer
