= Małe Łunawy =

- Village
- Location within Poland
- Coordinates: 53°23′N 18°36′E
- Country: Poland
- Voivodeship: Kuyavian-Pomeranian
- County: Chełmno
- Gmina: Chełmno
- Time zone: UTC+1 (CET)
  - Summer (DST): UTC+2 (CEST)
- Vehicle registration: CCH

Małe Łunawy [ˈmawɛ wuˈnavɨ] is a village in the administrative district of Gmina Chełmno, within Chełmno County, Kuyavian-Pomeranian Voivodeship, in north-central Poland. It is located in Chełmno Land within the historic region of Pomerania.

== History ==
During the German occupation of Poland (World War II), Małe Łunawy was one of the sites of executions of Poles, carried out by the Germans in 1939 as part of the Intelligenzaktion. In the winter of 1939–1940, the occupiers also carried out expulsions of Poles, who were then deported to the General Government in the more eastern part of German-occupied Poland, while their houses and farms were handed over to Germans as part of the Lebensraum policy.
