= Stargard (disambiguation) =

Starogard, Starogród, or Stargard means old fort or old city in Polish, Polabian and Pomeranian languages, and gard is Old Slavic, Old Germanic, Old Baltic, and Old Finnic for castle or fortification. Places with those names include:

== Poland ==
- Stargard, a town in West Pomeranian Voivodeship, that is the seat of Stargard County.
- Starogard Gdański, a town in Pomeranian Voivodeship, seat of Starogard County
- Starogard Łobeski, a village in West Pomeranian Voivodeship
- Stargard Gubiński, a village in Lubusz Voivodeship (W Poland)
- Santok, also known as Stargard, a village in Lubusz Voivodeship
- Starogród, Masovian Voivodeship
- Starogród Dolny, a village in the Kuyavian-Pomeranian Voivodeship
- Starogród Górny, a village in the Kuyavian-Pomeranian Voivodeship

== Germany ==
- Burg Stargard (until 1929: Stargard; Polabian: Stargart), town in Mecklenburg-Western Pomerania
  - Stargard Castle, castle in Burg Stargard
  - Lordship of Stargard, a region in North Germany named after Burg Stargard
  - Stargarder Land, a modern parish
  - Stargarder Land (wine region)
- Oldenburg in Holstein (originally: Starigard), town in Wagria, Schleswig-Holstein
- Sagard, town on the island of Rügen, Mecklenburg-Western Pomerania

== States ==
- Duchy of Mecklenburg-Stargard, duchy in Mecklenburg, existing from 1352 to 1471
- Duchy of Pomerania-Stargard duchy in Pomerania existing from 1377 to 1478

== Others ==
- Stargard (group), an American funk/soul band
- Stargard (album)

== See also ==
- Gord (Slavic settlement)
