= Bieńkówka =

Bieńkówka refers to the following places in Poland:

- Bieńkówka, Kuyavian-Pomeranian Voivodeship
- Bieńkówka, Lesser Poland Voivodeship
