= Podwiesk =

- Village
- Location within Poland
- Coordinates: 53°24′N 18°35′E
- Country: Poland
- Voivodeship: Kuyavian-Pomeranian
- County: Chełmno
- Gmina: Chełmno
- Time zone: UTC+1 (CET)
  - Summer (DST): UTC+2 (CEST)
- Vehicle registration: CCH

Podwiesk [ˈpɔdvjɛsk] is a village in the administrative district of Gmina Chełmno, within Chełmno County, Kuyavian-Pomeranian Voivodeship, in north-central Poland. It is located in Chełmno Land within the historic region of Pomerania.

== History ==
During the German occupation of Poland (World War II), Podwiesk was one of the sites of executions of Poles, carried out by the Germans in 1939 as part of the Intelligenzaktion.
