= Starogród Górny =

- Village
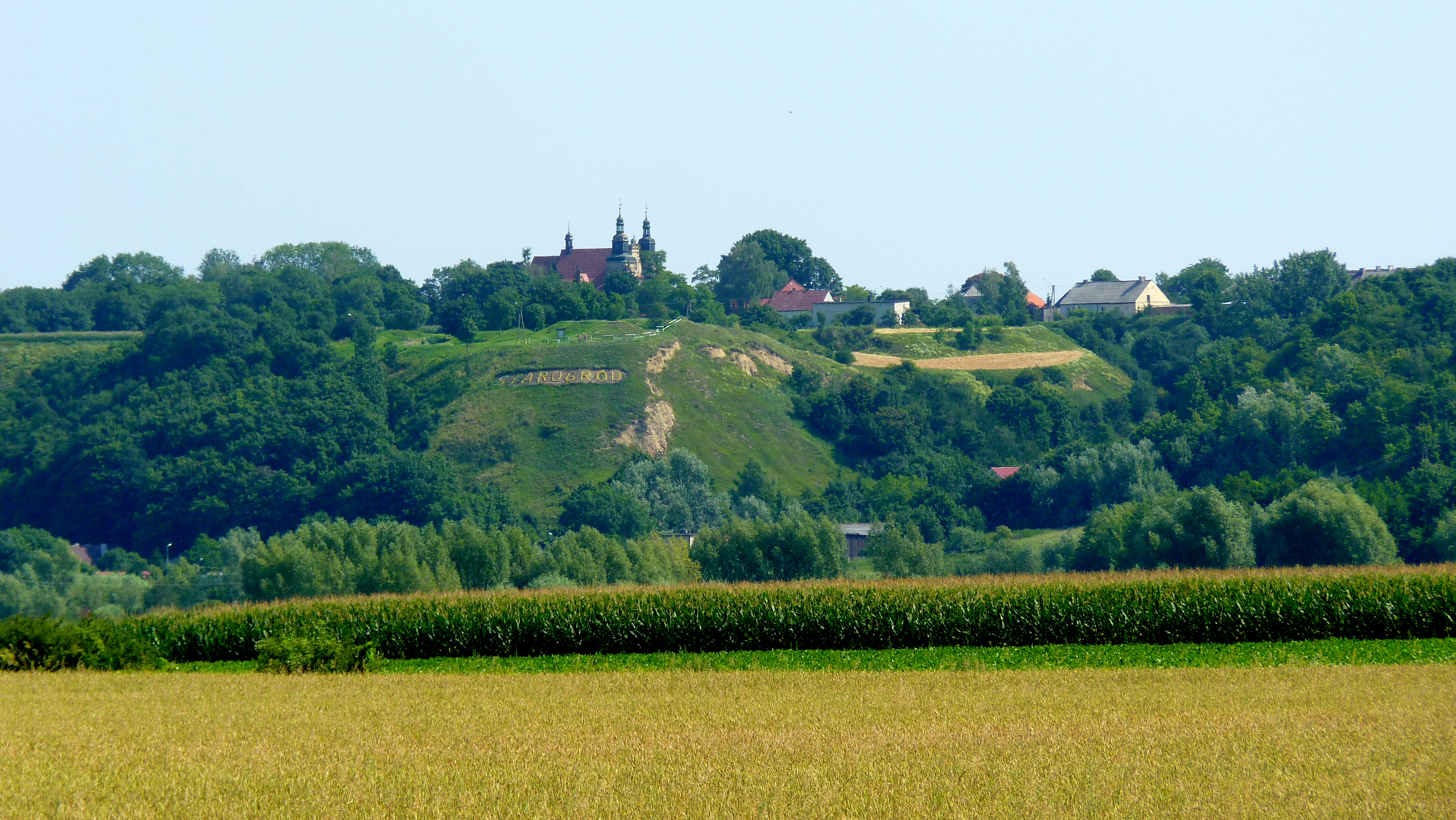
- View of the Castle Hill

- Location within Poland
- Coordinates: 53°18′36″N 18°22′46″E
- Country: Poland
- Voivodeship: Kuyavian-Pomeranian
- County: Chełmno
- Gmina: Chełmno
- Time zone: UTC+1 (CET)
  - Summer (DST): UTC+2 (CEST)
- Vehicle registration: CCH

Starogród Górny [staˈrɔɡrut ˈɡurnɨ] is a village in the administrative district of Gmina Chełmno, within Chełmno County, Kuyavian-Pomeranian Voivodeship, in north-central Poland. It is located in the Chełmno Land in the historic region of Pomerania.

== History ==
During the German occupation (World War II), Starogród was one of the sites of executions of Poles, carried out by the Germans in 1939 as part of the Intelligenzaktion. Many Poles from Starogród, including local teachers, were also murdered by the Germans during large massacres of Poles committed in the nearby villages of Klamry and Małe Czyste, also as part of the Intelligenzaktion.

== Sports ==
The local football club is Gwiazda Starogród. It competes in the lower leagues.
