= Wielkie Łunawy =

- Village
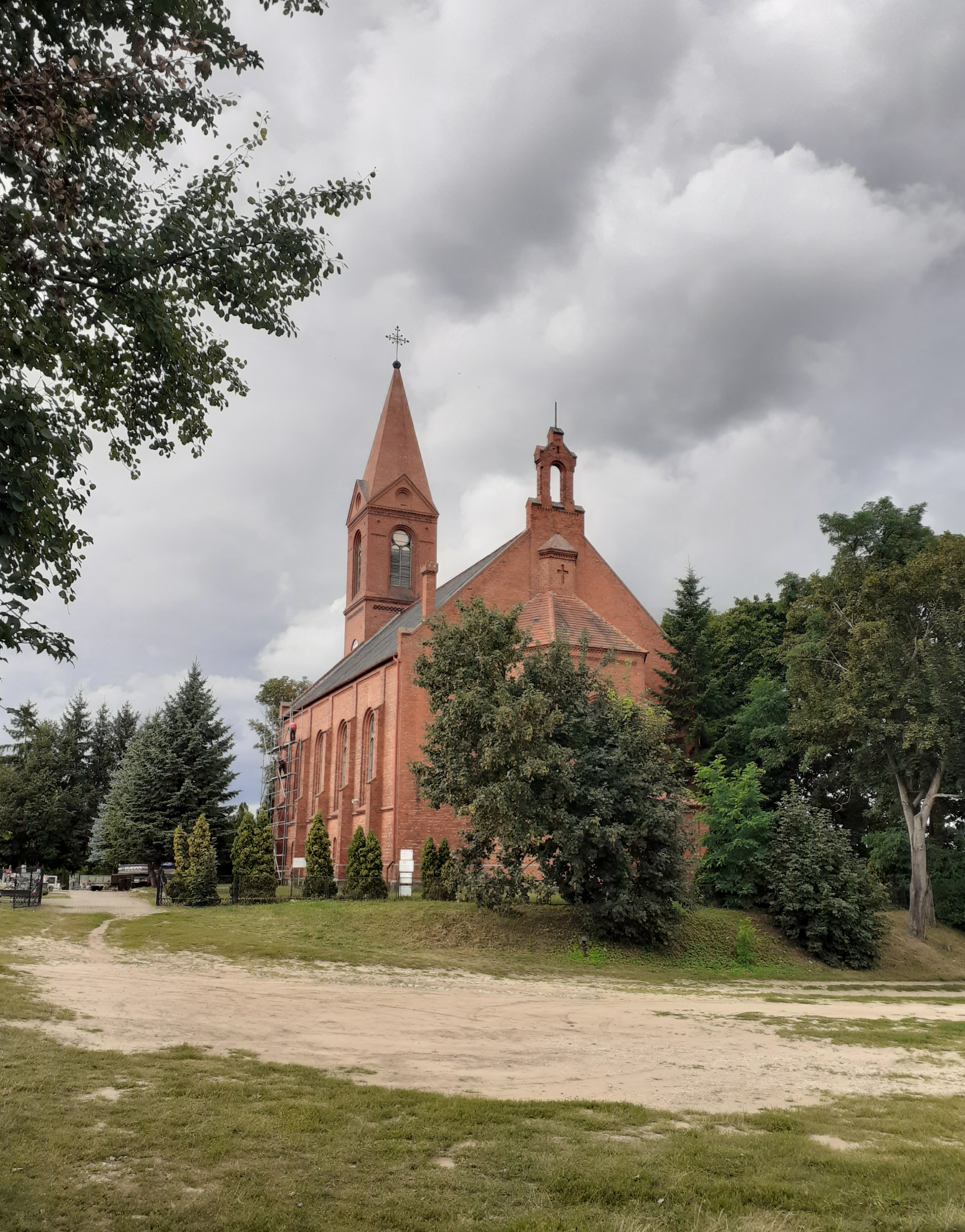
- Church of the Assumption of Mary in Wielkie Łunawy

- Location within Poland
- Coordinates: 53°23′N 18°37′E
- Country: Poland
- Voivodeship: Kuyavian-Pomeranian
- County: Chełmno
- Gmina: Chełmno
- First mentioned: 1222
- Time zone: UTC+1 (CET)
  - Summer (DST): UTC+2 (CEST)
- Vehicle registration: CCH

Wielkie Łunawy [ˈvjɛlkʲɛ wuˈnavɨ] is a village in the administrative district of Gmina Chełmno, within Chełmno County, Kuyavian-Pomeranian Voivodeship, in north-central Poland. It is located in Chełmno Land within the historic region of Pomerania.

== History ==
During the German occupation of Poland (World War II), Wielkie Łunawy was one of the sites of executions of Poles, carried out by the Germans in 1939 as part of the Intelligenzaktion.
