= Borówno, Chełmno County =

Borówno
- Village
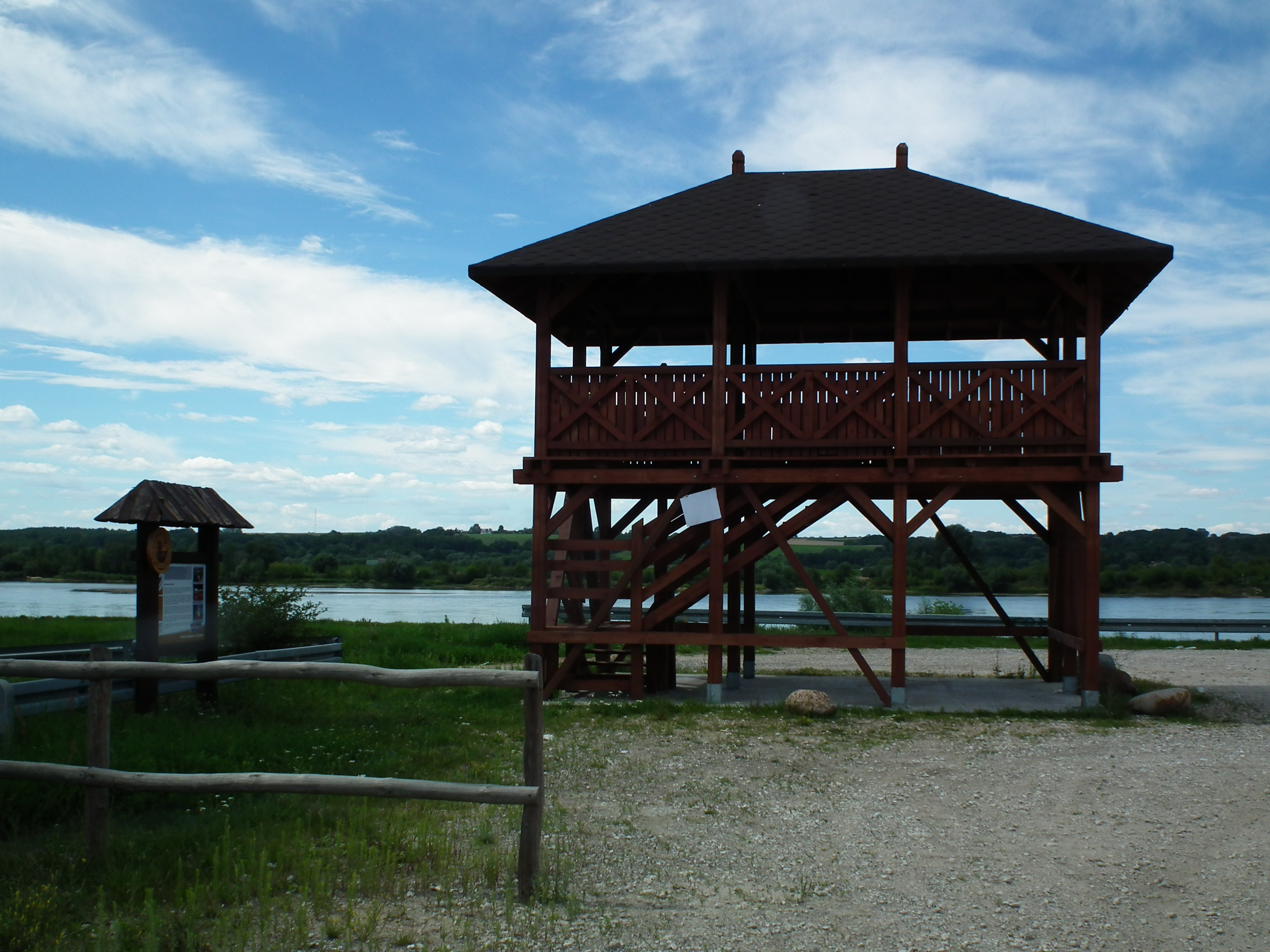
- Observation tower near the Vistula River in Borówno

- Location within Poland
- Coordinates: 53°18′N 18°21′E
- Country: Poland
- Voivodeship: Kuyavian-Pomeranian
- County: Chełmno
- Gmina: Chełmno
- Time zone: UTC+1 (CET)
  - Summer (DST): UTC+2 (CEST)
- Vehicle registration: CCH

Borówno [bɔˈruvnɔ] is a village in the administrative district of Gmina Chełmno, within Chełmno County, Kuyavian-Pomeranian Voivodeship, in north-central Poland. It is located on the right bank of the Vistula river, in the Chełmno Land in the historic region of Pomerania.

== History ==
Borówno was a private church village, administratively located in the Chełmno Voivodeship of the Kingdom of Poland.

During the German occupation (World War II), in 1939, farmers from Borówno were murdered by the German Selbstschutz in the massacre of Poles committed in nearby Płutowo as part of the Intelligenzaktion.
