= Duchy of Stargard =

Duchy of Stargard may refer to:

- Duchy of Mecklenburg-Stargard, state in Mecklenburg, that existed from 1352 to 1471
- Duchy of Pomerania-Stargard, state in Pomerania that existed from 1377 to 1478

== See also ==
- Stargard (disambiguation)
