= Kolno, Kuyavian-Pomeranian Voivodeship =

Kolno
- Village
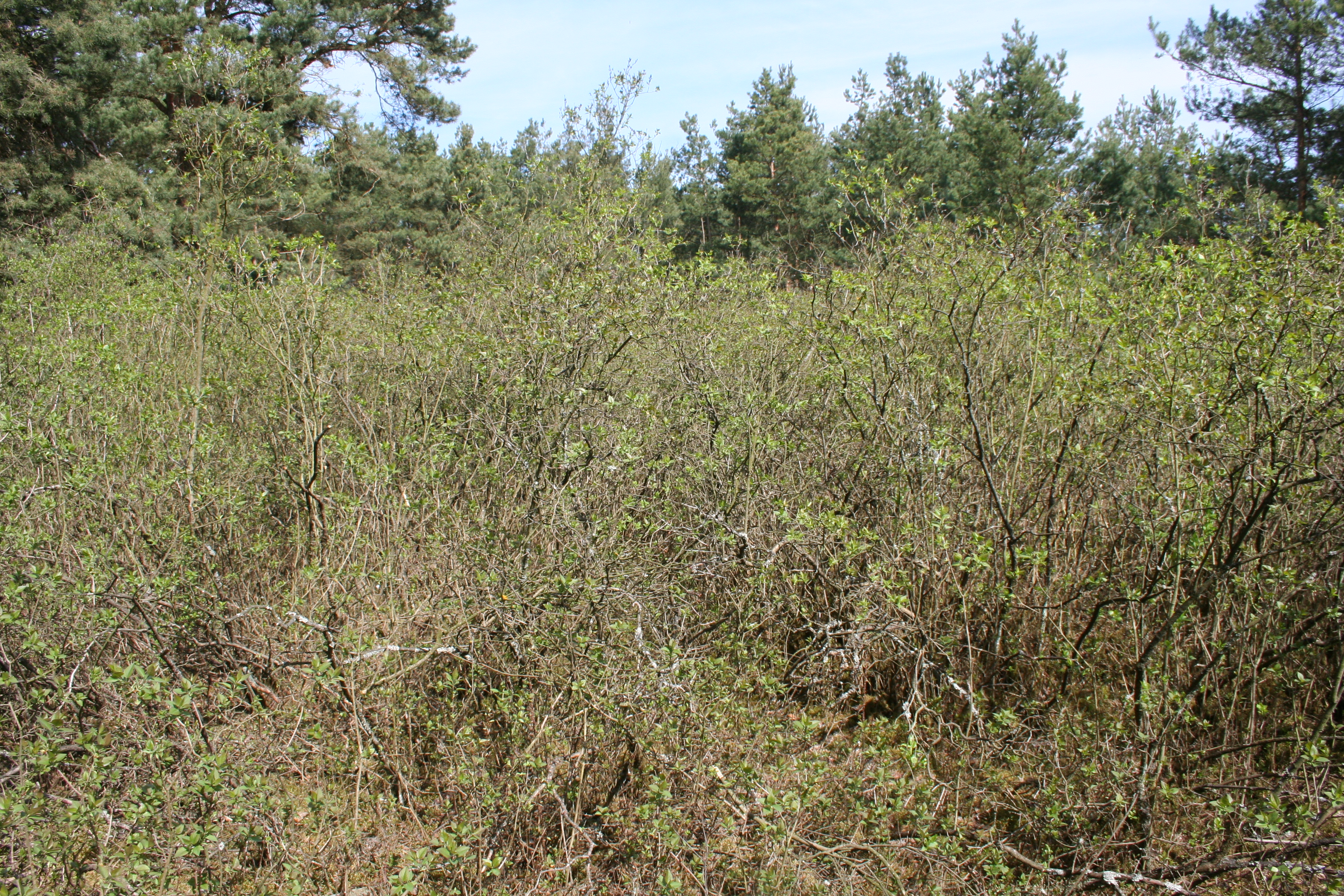

- Location within Poland
- Coordinates: 53°24′N 18°30′E
- Country: Poland
- Voivodeship: Kuyavian-Pomeranian
- County: Chełmno
- Gmina: Chełmno
- Time zone: UTC+1 (CET)
  - Summer (DST): UTC+2 (CEST)
- Vehicle registration: CCH

Kolno [ˈkɔlnɔ] is a village in the administrative district of Gmina Chełmno, within Chełmno County, Kuyavian-Pomeranian Voivodeship, in north-central Poland. It is located in Chełmno Land within the historic region of Pomerania.

== History ==
Kolno was a private church village, administratively located in the Chełmno Voivodeship of the Kingdom of Poland.

During the German occupation of Poland (World War II), Kolno was one of the sites of executions of Poles, carried out by the Germans in 1939 as part of the Intelligenzaktion.
