= Osnowo =

- Village
- Location within Poland
- Coordinates: 53°19′55″N 18°25′44″E
- Country: Poland
- Voivodeship: Kuyavian-Pomeranian
- County: Chełmno
- Gmina: Chełmno

Osnowo [ɔsˈnɔvɔ] is a village in the administrative district of Gmina Chełmno, within Chełmno County, Kuyavian-Pomeranian Voivodeship, in north-central Poland.
