= Górne Wymiary =

- Village
- Location within Poland
- Coordinates: 53°23′6″N 18°30′14″E
- Country: Poland
- Voivodeship: Kuyavian-Pomeranian
- County: Chełmno
- Gmina: Chełmno

Górne Wymiary [ˈɡurnɛ vɨˈmjarɨ]; translation: Upper Dimensions) is a village in the administrative district of Gmina Chełmno, within Chełmno County, Kuyavian-Pomeranian Voivodeship, in north-central Poland.
