= Ostrów Świecki =

- Village
- Location within Poland
- Coordinates: 53°24′N 18°30′E
- Country: Poland
- Voivodeship: Kuyavian-Pomeranian
- County: Chełmno
- Gmina: Chełmno
- Time zone: UTC+1 (CET)
  - Summer (DST): UTC+2 (CEST)
- Vehicle registration: CCH

Ostrów Świecki (Polish: [ˈɔstruf ˈɕfjɛt͡skʲi]) is a village in the administrative district of Gmina Chełmno, within Chełmno County, Kuyavian-Pomeranian Voivodeship, in north-central Poland.

== History ==
During the German occupation of Poland (World War II), Ostrów Świecki was one of the sites of executions of Poles, carried out by the Germans in 1939 as part of the Intelligenzaktion. In 1940, the German gendarmerie carried out expulsions of Poles, whose houses and farms were then handed over to German colonists as part of the Lebensraum policy.
