= Łęg, Kuyavian-Pomeranian Voivodeship =

Łęg
- Village
- Location within Poland
- Coordinates: 53°25′N 18°33′E
- Country: Poland
- Voivodeship: Kuyavian-Pomeranian
- County: Chełmno
- Gmina: Chełmno

Łęg [wɛnk] is a village in the administrative district of Gmina Chełmno, within Chełmno County, Kuyavian-Pomeranian Voivodeship, in north-central Poland.
