= Gmina Chełmno =

Gmina in Kuyavian-Pomeranian Voivodeship, Poland

Gmina Chełmno Chełmno Commune
- Gmina
- Coat of arms
- Interactive map of Gmina Chełmno
- Coordinates (Chełmno): 53°21′57″N 18°25′22″E
- Country: Poland
- Voivodeship: Kuyavian-Pomeranian
- County: Chełmno
- Seat: Chełmno

Area
  - Total: 114.05 km^{2} (44.03 sq mi)

Population (2006)
  - Total: 5,239
  - Density: 45.94/km^{2} (119.0/sq mi)
- Website: http://www.gmina-chelmno.pl/

Gmina Chełmno is a rural gmina (administrative district) in Chełmno County, Kuyavian-Pomeranian Voivodeship, in north-central Poland. Its seat is the town of Chełmno, although the town is not part of the territory of the gmina.

The gmina covers an area of 114.05 square kilometres (44.0 sq mi), and as of 2006 its total population is 5,239.

== Villages ==
Gmina Chełmno contains the villages and settlements of Bieńkówka, Borówno, Dolne Wymiary, Dorposz Chełmiński, Górne Wymiary, Kałdus, Klamry, Kolno, Łęg, Małe Łunawy, Nowawieś Chełmińska, Nowe Dobra, Osnowo, Ostrów Świecki, Podwiesk, Różnowo, Starogród Dolny, Starogród Górny and Wielkie Łunawy.

== Neighbouring gminas ==
Gmina Chełmno is bordered by the gminas of Dragacz, Grudziądz, Kijewo Królewskie, Płużnica, Pruszcz, Stolno, Świecie and Unisław.
