= Dorposz Chełmiński =

- Village
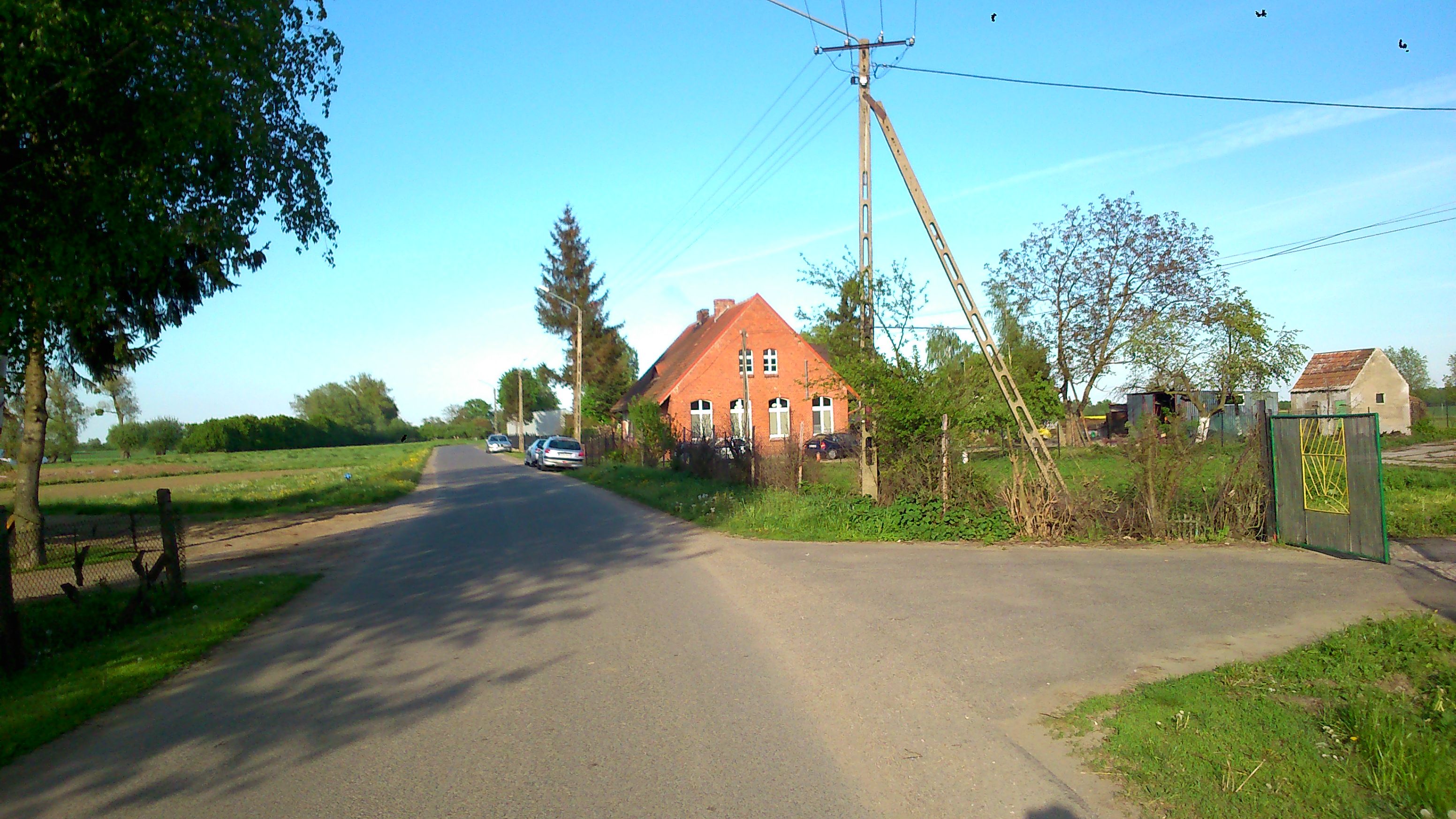

- Location within Poland
- Coordinates: 53°26′N 18°36′E
- Country: Poland
- Voivodeship: Kuyavian-Pomeranian
- County: Chełmno
- Gmina: Chełmno

Dorposz Chełmiński [ˈdɔrpɔʂ xɛu̯ˈmiɲski] is a village in the administrative district of Gmina Chełmno, within Chełmno County, Kuyavian-Pomeranian Voivodeship, in north-central Poland.
