= Starogród Dolny =

- Village
- Location within Poland
- Coordinates: 53°19′35″N 18°22′07″E
- Country: Poland
- Voivodeship: Kuyavian-Pomeranian
- County: Chełmno
- Gmina: Chełmno

Starogród Dolny [staˈrɔɡrut ˈdɔlnɨ] is a village in the administrative district of Gmina Chełmno within Chełmno County, Kuyavian-Pomeranian Voivodeship in north-central Poland.
