= Grudziądz Granaries =

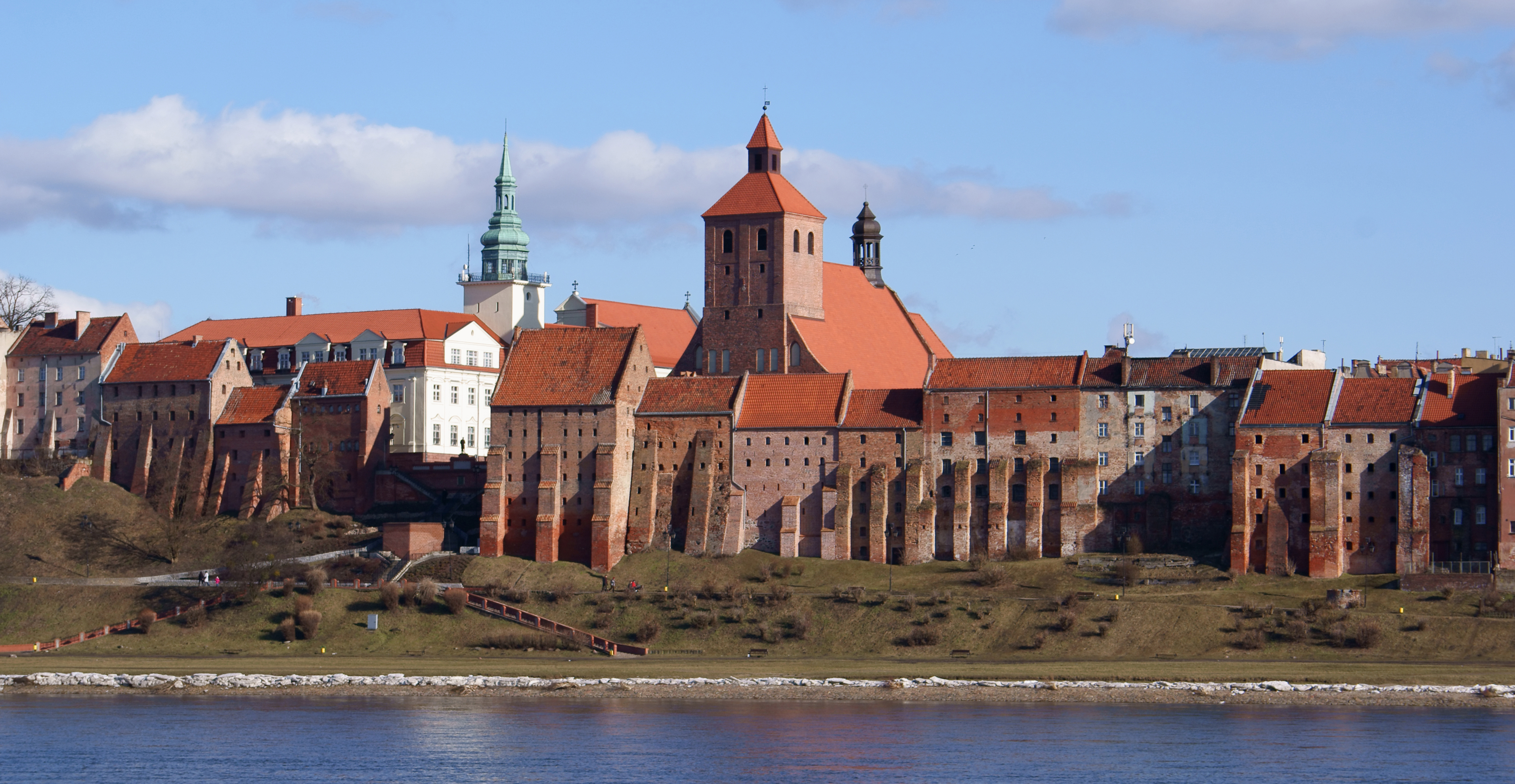
- Granaries viewed from the left bank of the Vistula
- Interactive map of the Grudziądz Granaries area

General information
- Type: Granaries
- Architectural style: Gothic
- Location: Grudziądz, Poland
- Completed: 1346-1351, 1504

Historic Monument of Poland
- Designated: 2017-11-22
- Reference no.: Dz. U., 2017, No. 2271

Grudziądz Granaries (Polish: Spichrze w Grudziądzu) is a unique 14th-century fortification complex of river bank granaries on the Vistula river in Grudziądz, Poland.

== History ==
After the Teutonic Order founded the settlement of present-day Grudziądz in 1291, the Order began building fortifications encompassing the town in the fourteenth-century. Formerly, a line of fortifications already existed on a scarp to the west of the settlement. It was in the years 1346-51 that the first granary, Bornwald Granary, was built, followed by several in 1364. By 1504, around modern-day Spichrzowa Street (lit. Granary Street), fourteen granaries had already been constructed, reflecting the importance of Grudziądz in trade of craftsmanship in the region. A century later, there were 16 granaries. The construction of the granaries on top of the town walls along the Vistula river was done so to be in close proximity with the river port, and thus take advantage of the flourishing grain trade. Due to the different elevations of town and river, the granaries, which from the river side look like imposing multi-stories buildings, from the town side feature only one or two floors.

Other than for grain trading purposes, the granaries performed other functions, i.e. one of the granaries, between 1603 and 1608 (or 1618) served as a Lutheran place of worship. During the Deluge at the hand of the Swedes, most of the granaries were burned down and only six had survived during the Swedish siege of Grudziądz. Rebuilding works lasted until the eighteenth-century, as a consequence of which, in relation to the former granary plans, those rebuilt had been less wide, covering smaller parcels of land individually. The following, nineteenth-century, further framework granaries had been built along the river scarp and riverfront (presently non-existent). Five granaries burned down in 1903, some were utilised for housing via enlarging windows and creating balconies on each elevation.

A monumental amount of damage occurred during the final Soviet Vistula–Oder Offensive during 1945. The granaries were rebuilt between 1946 and 1966. Presently, some of the granary building still perform their storage function, some have been adapted for residential use, whilst others are occupied by the Museum of Grudziądz.

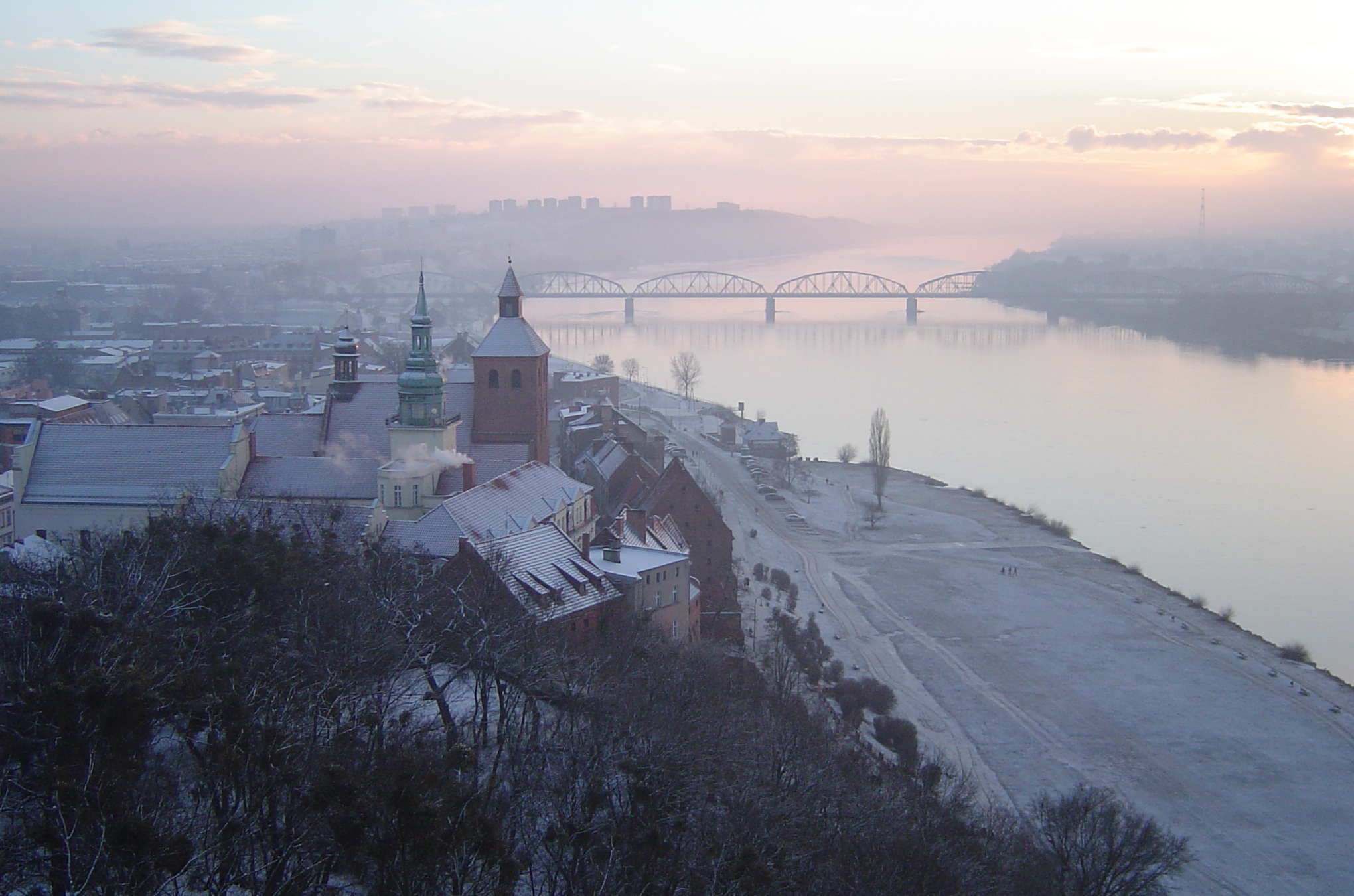
Southernly view from Klimek Tower onto the Vistula River and Bronisław Malinowski Bridge

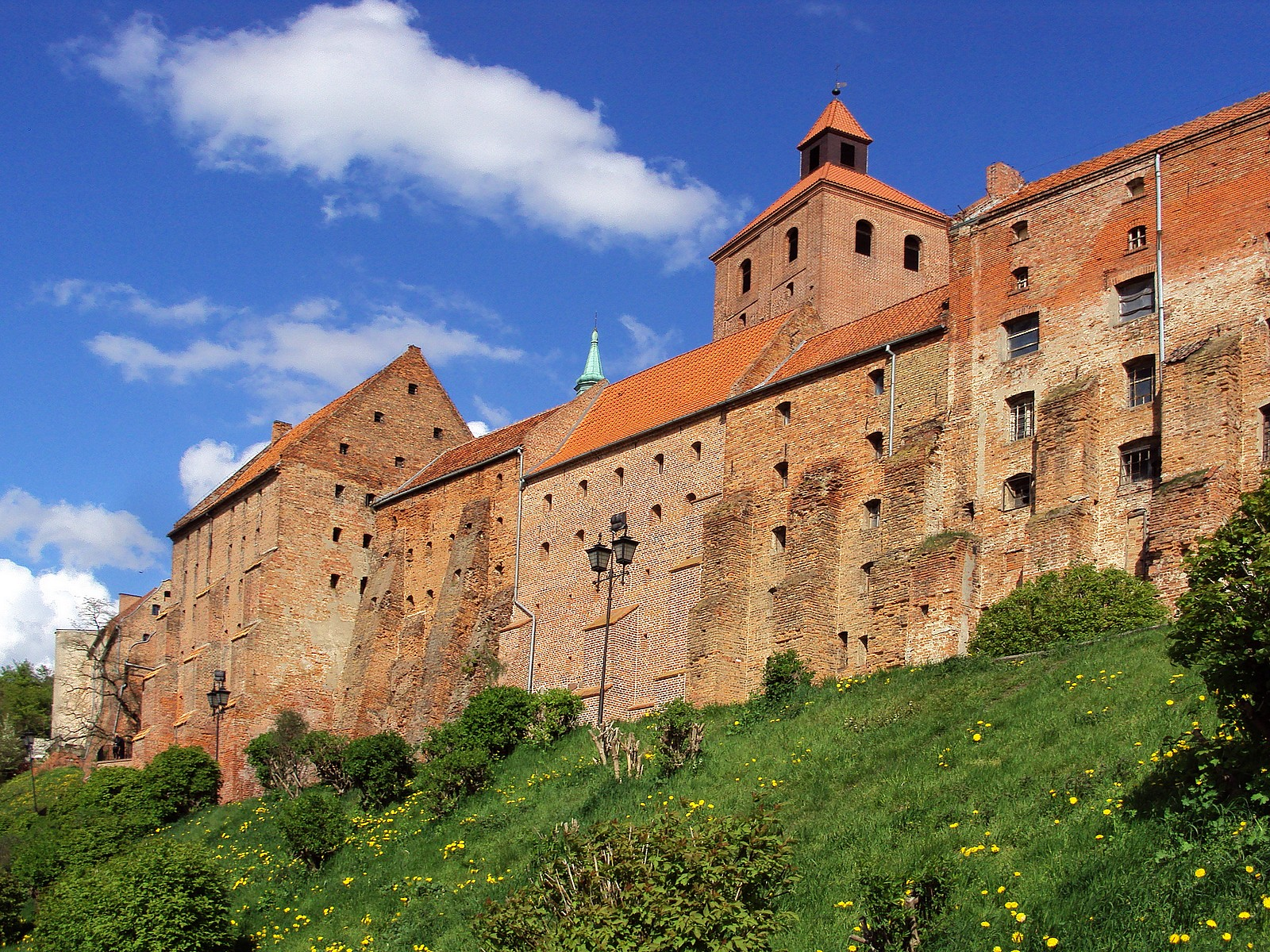
View from the Vistulan Boulevard

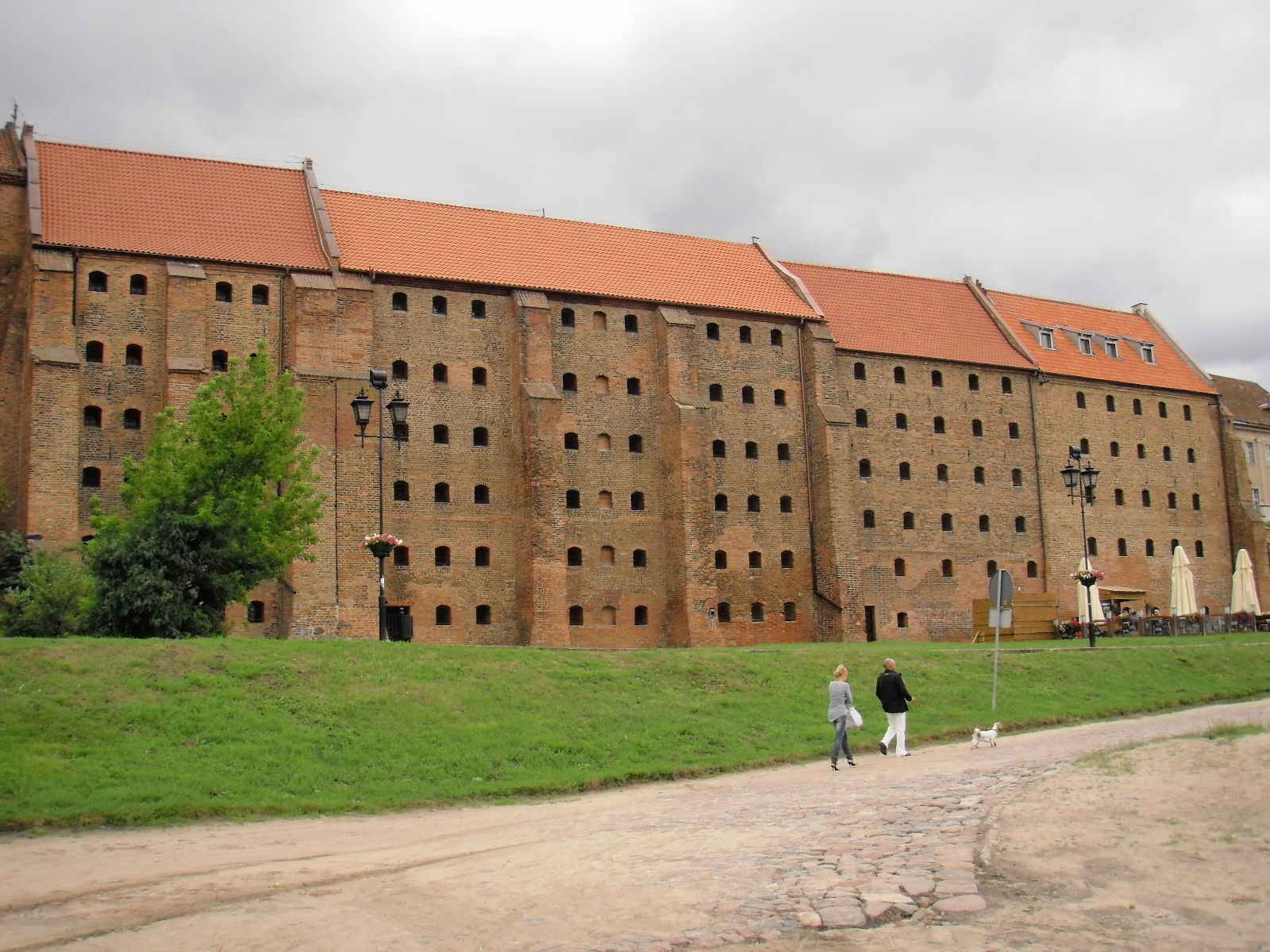
Granaries in Staromiejska District

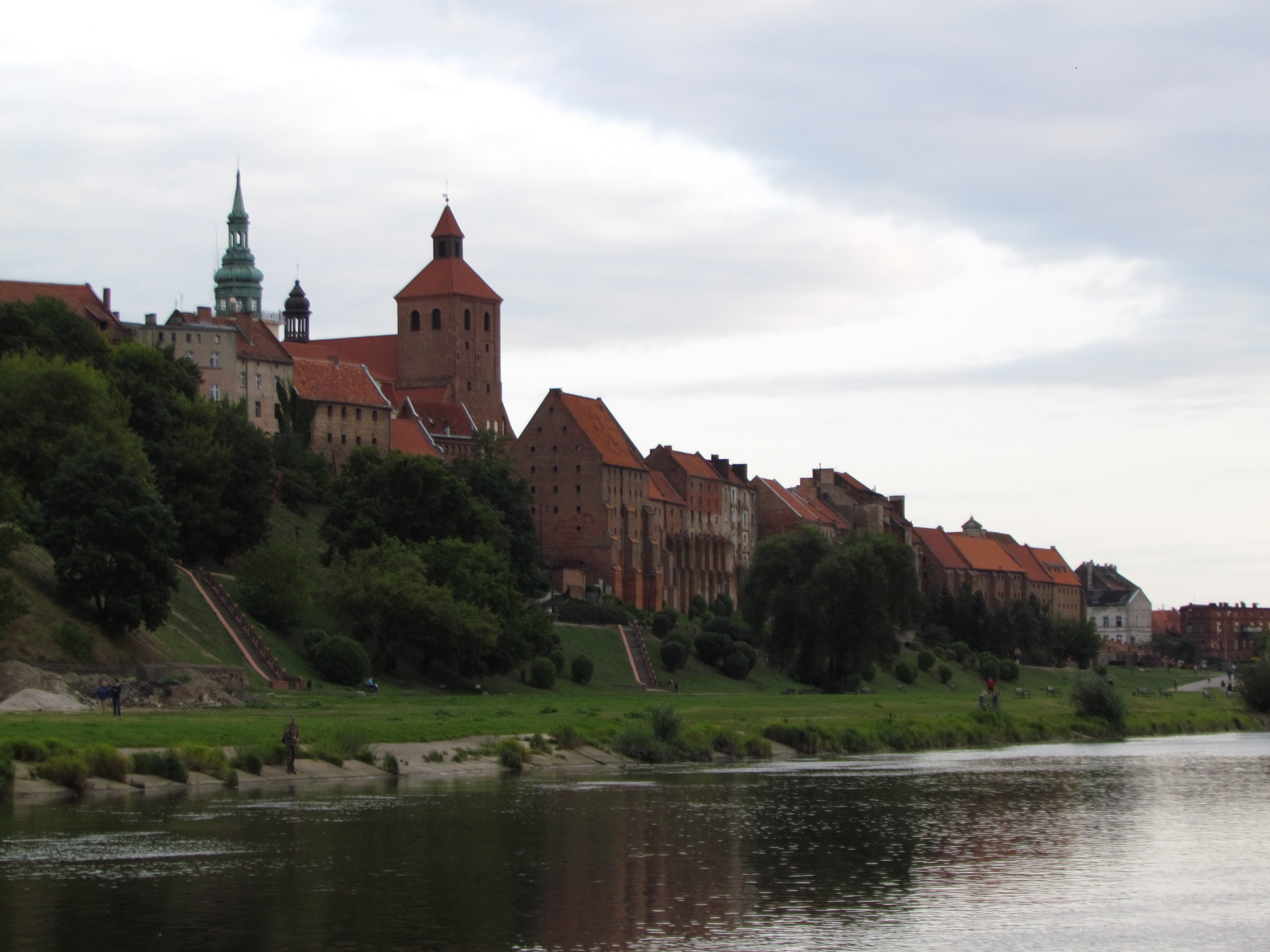
View of the right bank of the Vistula River and Grudziądz
