= Klamry =

- Village
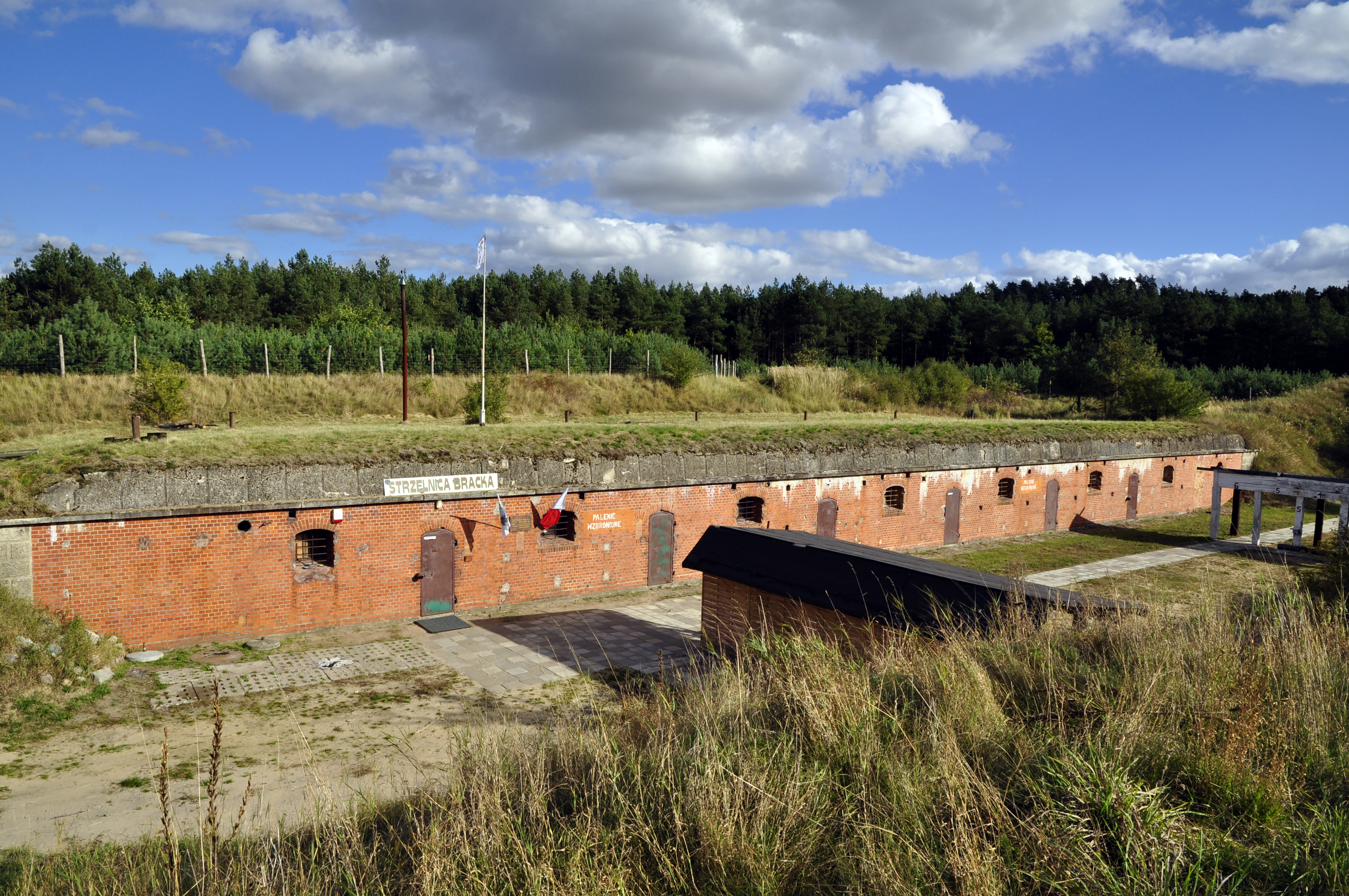
- Fort VIII of the Chełmno Fortress in Klamry

- Location within Poland
- Coordinates: 53°22′N 18°31′E
- Country: Poland
- Voivodeship: Kuyavian-Pomeranian
- County: Chełmno
- Gmina: Chełmno
- Time zone: UTC+1 (CET)
  - Summer (DST): UTC+2 (CEST)
- Vehicle registration: CCH

Klamry [ˈklamrɨ] is a village in the administrative district of Gmina Chełmno, within Chełmno County, Kuyavian-Pomeranian Voivodeship, in north-central Poland. It is located in the Chełmno Land in the historic region of Pomerania.

== History ==
During the German occupation (World War II), the local Rybieniec forest was the site of large massacres of around 2,000 Poles from Chełmno and the county, carried out by the Germans from October 12 to November 11, 1939, as part of the Intelligenzaktion. Among the victims were teachers, farmers and priests from various villages, and engineers, craftsmen, local officials and priests from Chełmno. In 1944, the Germans burned the bodies to cover up the crime.

== Sports ==
The local football club is Tartak Klamry. It competes in the lower leagues.
