= Chełmno Land =

Historical region in north-central Poland

Chełmno Land Ziemia chełmińska
- Historical region
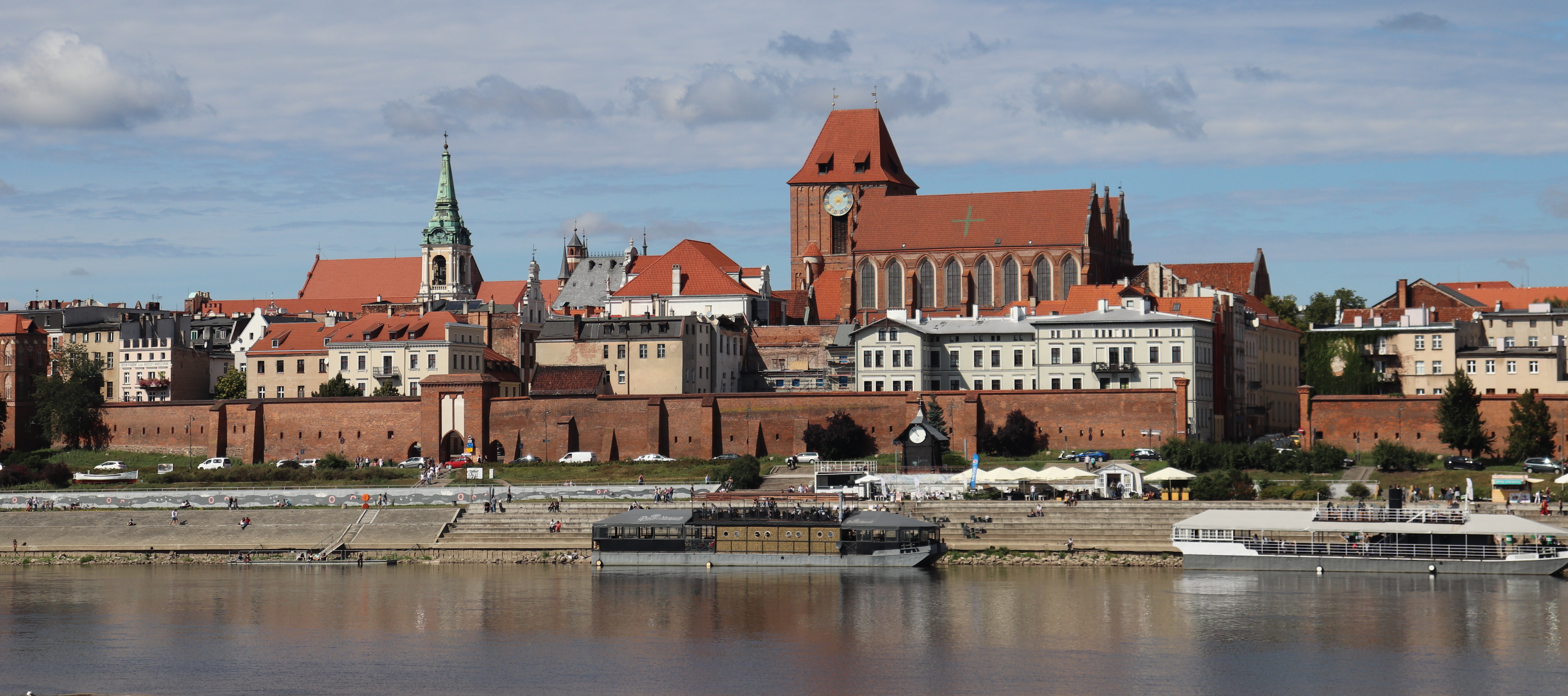
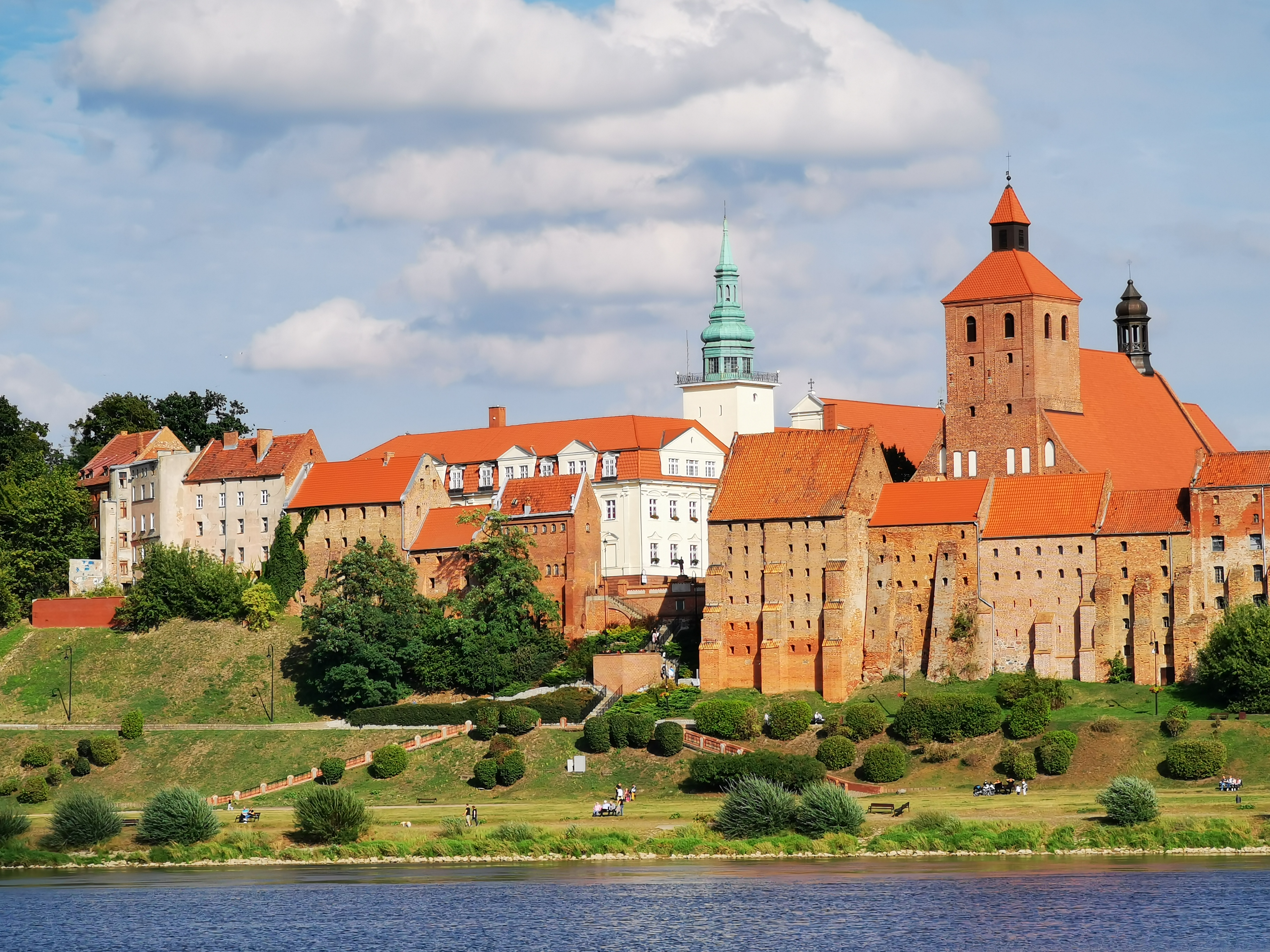
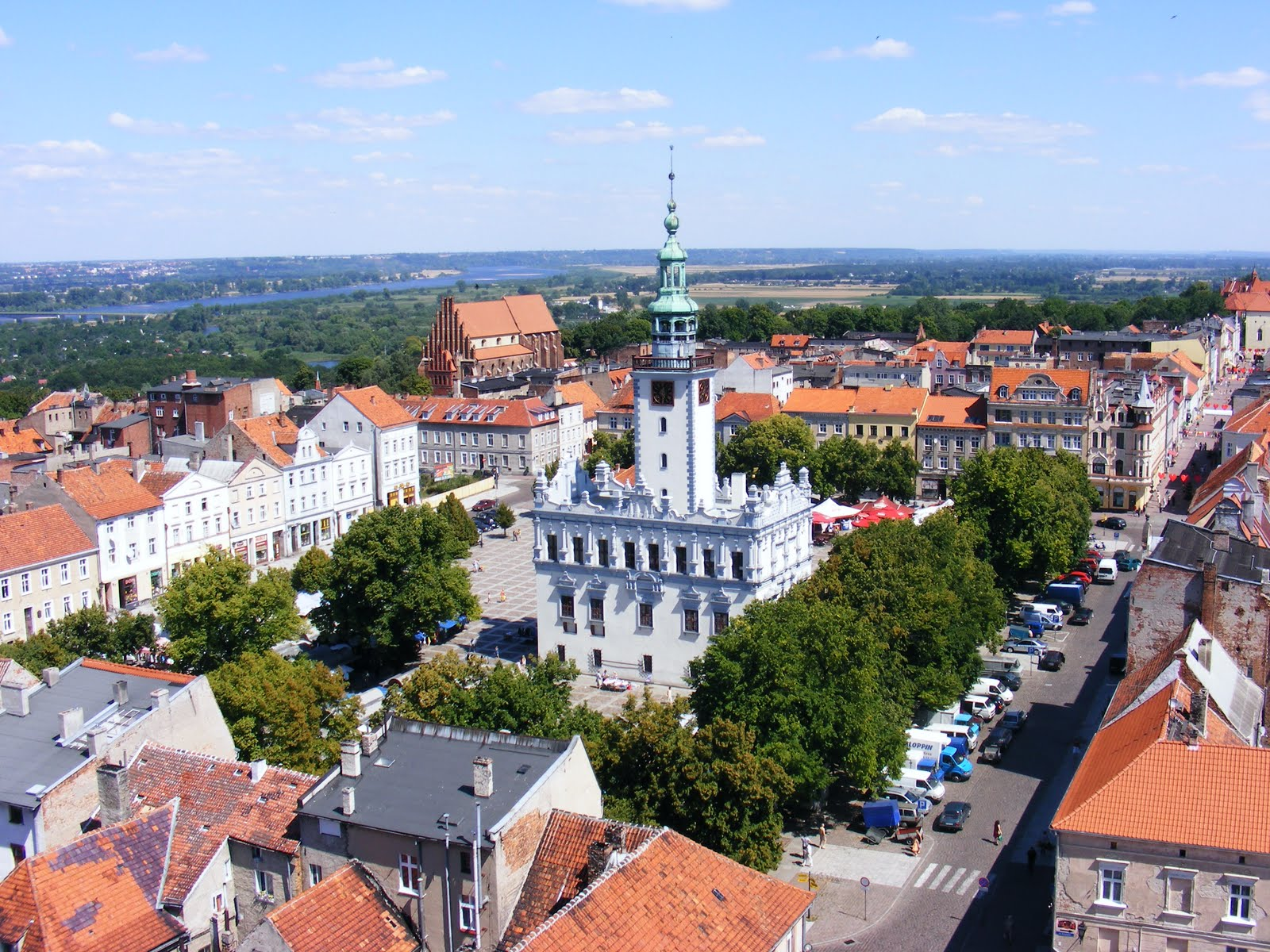
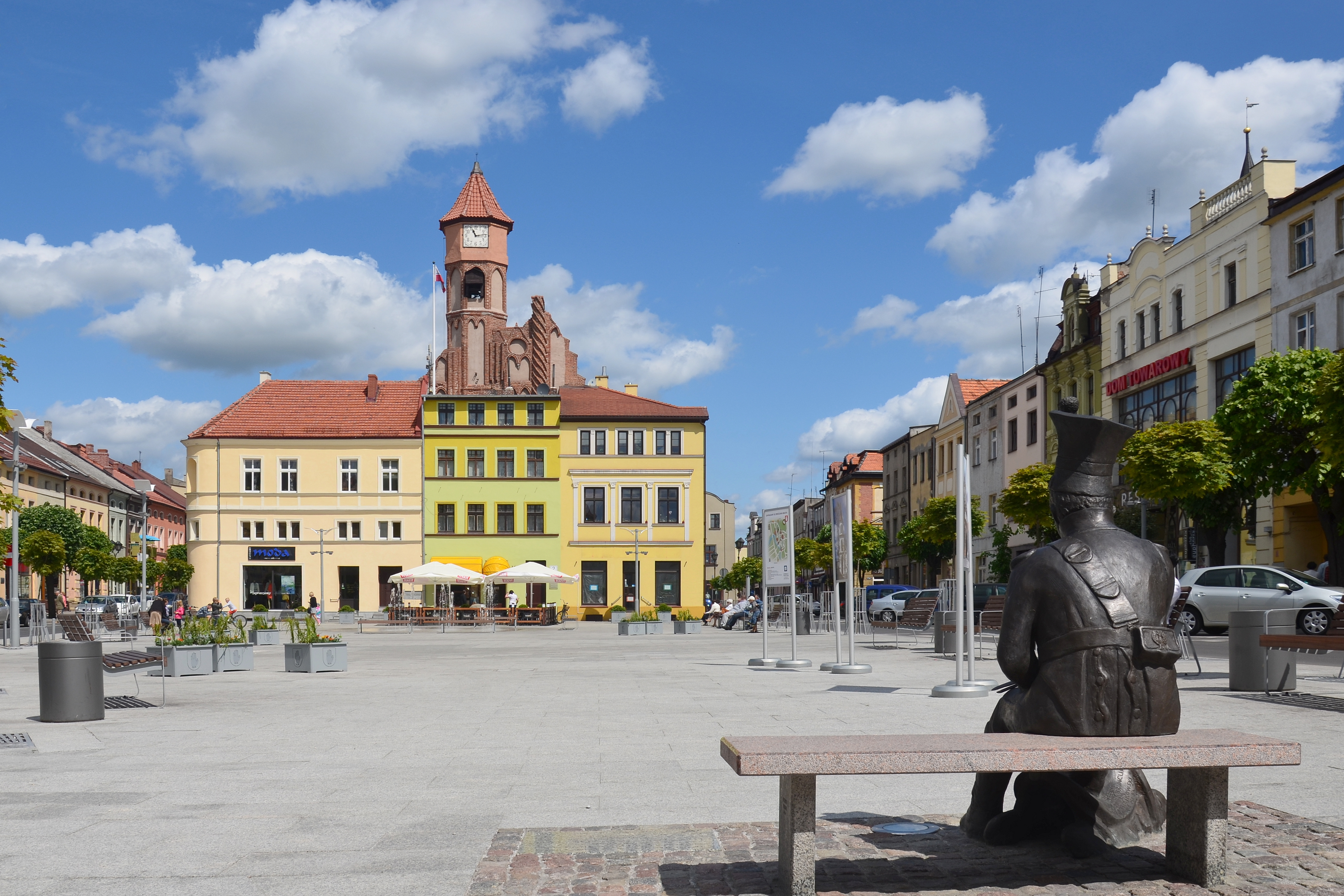
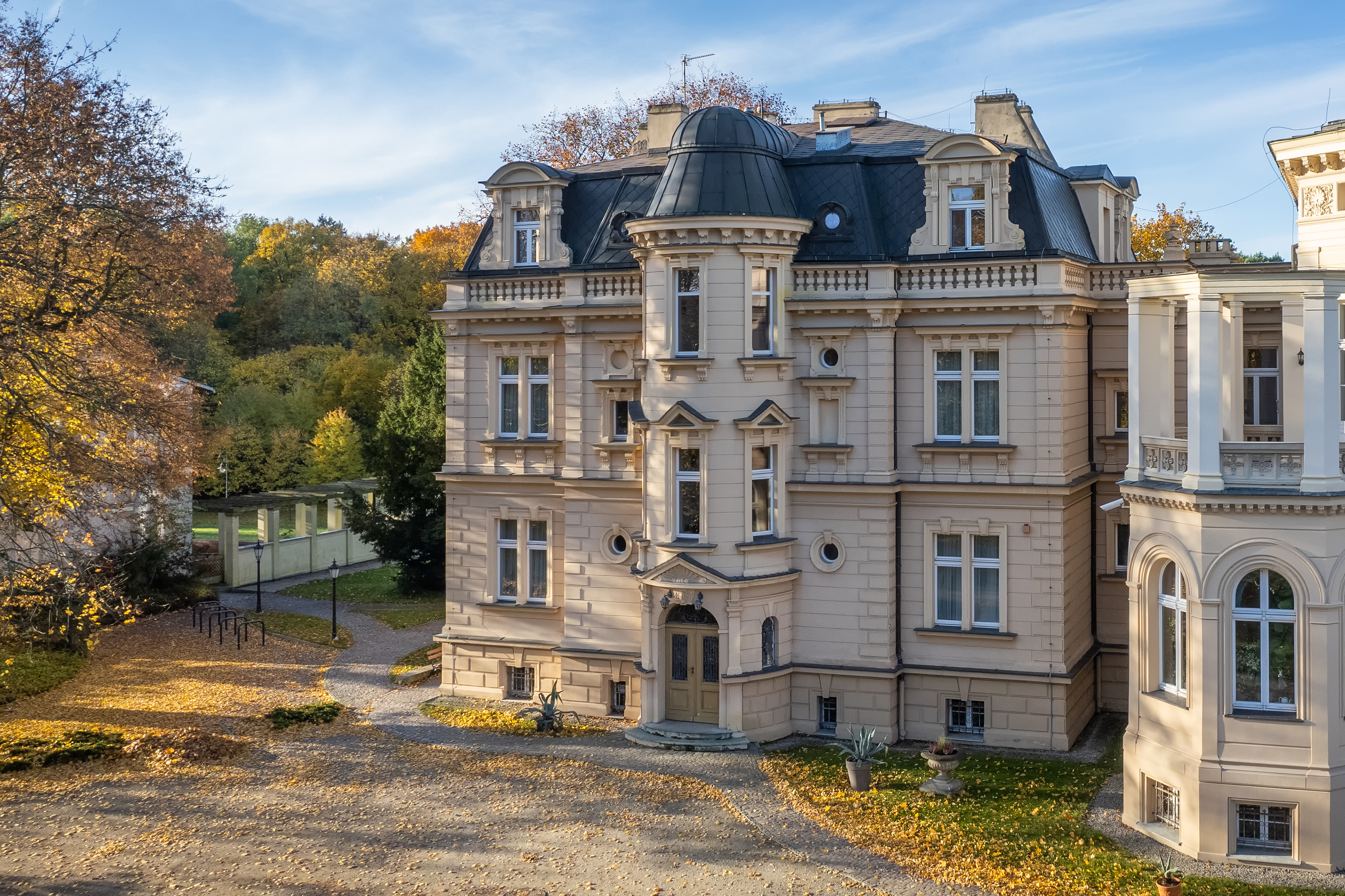
- Toruń Old Town Grudziądz Old Town Chełmno Old Town Market Square in Brodnica Hunting lodge in Ostromecko

- Chełmno Land (medium green) on the map of Poland
- Coordinates: 53°25′N 18°50′E
- Country: Poland
- Historical capital: Chełmno
- Largest city: Toruń
- Time zone: UTC+1 (CET)
  - Summer (DST): UTC+2 (CEST)

Chełmno land (Polish: ziemia chełmińska, German: Culmer Land or Kulmerland) is a part of the historical region of Pomerelia, located in central-northern Poland.

Chełmno land is named after the city of Chełmno. The largest city in the region is Toruń; another bigger city is Grudziądz.

It is located on the right bank of the Vistula river, from the mouth of the Drwęca (southern boundary) to the Osa (northern). Its eastern frontier is Lubawa Land.

The region, depending on the period and interpretation, may be included in other larger regions: Mazovia, Pomerania or Prussia. Currently in Poland it is classified as part of Pomerania, due to strong connections with Gdańsk Pomerania in recent centuries, with which it is collectively called the Vistula Pomerania (Pomorze Nadwiślańskie), although it also has close ties with neighboring Kuyavia. As a result it forms part of the Kuyavian-Pomeranian Voivodship, although a small part of the Chełmno Land is located in the Warmian-Masurian Voivodeship. Initially it was the westernmost part of Mazovia within medieval Poland, especially after the fragmentation of Poland. According to German historiography, it is classified as part of Prussia, although it did not form part of pre-Christian Prussia and was not inhabited by the Old Prussians, but by Slavic Lechites, who in the 10th century became part of the emerging Polish state.

Chełmno Land borders Gdańsk Pomerania (Kociewie, Bory Tucholskie), and Powiśle in the north, Masuria in the north-east, Dobrzyń Land in the south-east, and Kuyavia in the west.

== History ==
=== Medieval period ===
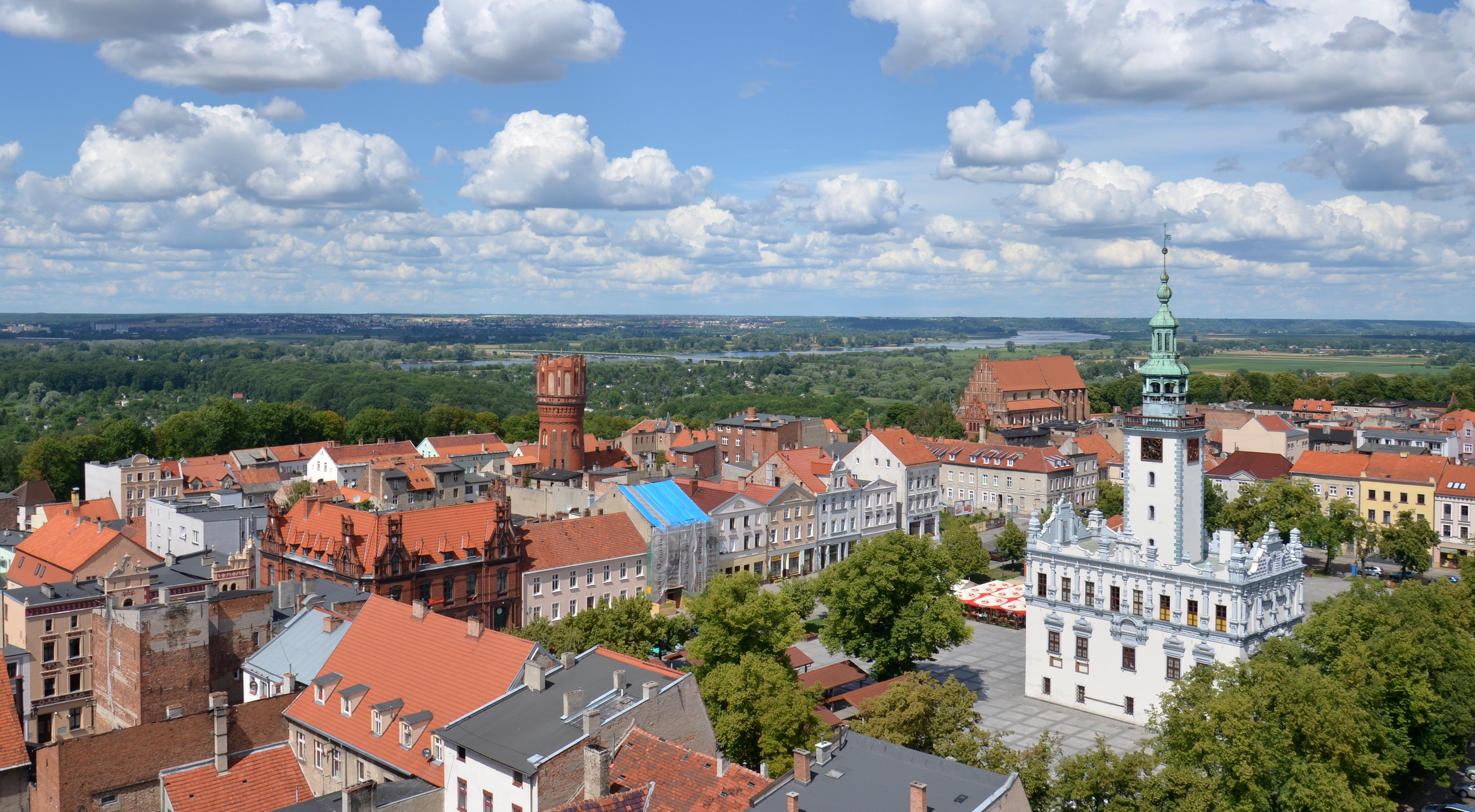
Chełmno, the historic capital of Chełmno Land

The first historical account of Chełmno and Chełmno Land dates back to 1065 when Bolesław II of Poland granted a tax privilege to an abbey in a nearby Mogilno. The document lists Chełmno ("Culmine") along with other towns which then belonged to the Duchy of Masovia. The area, being closest to the Polans, came to be populated by the Lechitic Kuyavians and tribes from Greater Poland. The Masovians were led by Masos, who left the Polish duke Boleslaw I and sought refuge with the Prussians. When this area was subdued by the rulers of the Polans Chełmno became a local centre of castellany (kasztelania). Chełmno Land was Christianised in the 11th century.

According to the will of Duke Bolesław III Wrymouth, Chełmno Land, after his death in 1138 became a part of the Duchy of Masovia governed by his son Bolesław IV the Curly and his descendants during the feudal fragmentation of Poland.

By the 13th century the territory was subject to raids by pagan Old Prussians, who sacked Chełmno, the province's main town, in 1216. In 1220 Conrad I of Masovia, with the participation of the other dukes of Poland, led a partial reconquest of the province, but the project of establishing a Polish defense of the province failed due to conflicts between the dukes. He brought the crusading Knights of Dobrzyń to Masovia, where they built a castle at Dobrzyń in 1224 as a base for attacks against the Prussians. As a result, the territory was again sacked and devastated by Prussian raids, which led to depopulation of the province.

Being involved in dynastic struggles elsewhere and too weak to deal with the Prussians alone, Conrad needed to safeguard and establish borders against the heathen Old Prussians, because his territory of Masovia was also in danger after the Prussians besieged Płock. Conrad awarded the already devastated Chełmno Land to the Teutonic Knights, giving them Nieszawa at first. He also brought in German settlers to Płock.

In 1226 Duke Conrad I of Masovia enlisted the aid of the Teutonic Order to protect Masovia and help convert the Prussians to Christianity. In return, the knights were to keep Chełmno Land as a fief. The land constituted the base of the Monastic State of the Teutonic Knights, and its later conquest of Prussia.

The Teutonic Order obtained an Imperial bull from Emperor Frederick II before entering Prussia. In 1243 the papal legate William of Modena divided Prussia into four dioceses under the archbishop of Riga, with the town becoming the nominal see of the Roman Catholic Diocese of Chełmno (however, the cathedral and the residence of the bishop were located actually in the adjacent Chełmża).

Banner of Chełmno Land in battle of Grunwald (1410)

The Teutonic Knights occupied the region, despite papal verdicts to restore the region to Poland. In 1397, the Lizard Union, a secret anti-Teutonic organization of local nobility, was formed in the region. The region witnessed strong opposition to Teutonic wars of 1414 and 1431–1435 against Poland, with the nobility refusing to serve in the Teutonic army, some Polish nobles fighting on the side of Poland, and the city of Toruń refusing to pay taxes to the Teutonic Knights, not wanting to finance their war.

Coat of arms of the former Chełmno Voivodeship

In 1440 the anti-Teutonic Prussian Confederation was founded, and among its founders were cities of the Chełmno Land, including Toruń, Chełmno, Grudziądz and Brodnica. The city councils of Chełmno and Toruń, and the knights of Chełmno Land were the official representatives of the confederation. In 1454 the confederation started an uprising against the Teutonic Order and turned to Polish King Casimir IV Jagiellon with a request to reunite the region with Poland. The king agreed and signed the incorporation act, after which the Thirteen Years' War broke out. The representatives from the region, incl. nobility, knights, mayors and local officials, solemnly swore allegiance to the Polish King and the Kingdom of Poland in an official ceremony held in Toruń in 1454. The war ended in a Polish victory and by the Second Peace of Toruń in 1466, the return of Chełmno Land to the Polish Crown was confirmed. It administratively formed the Chełmno Voivodeship, located in the Royal Prussia province, later also in the larger Greater Poland Province. Its capital was Chełmno, while the largest city was Toruń, which as a royal city became one of the largest and wealthiest cities of Poland, and was the site of numerous significant events in the history of Poland.

=== Modern period ===
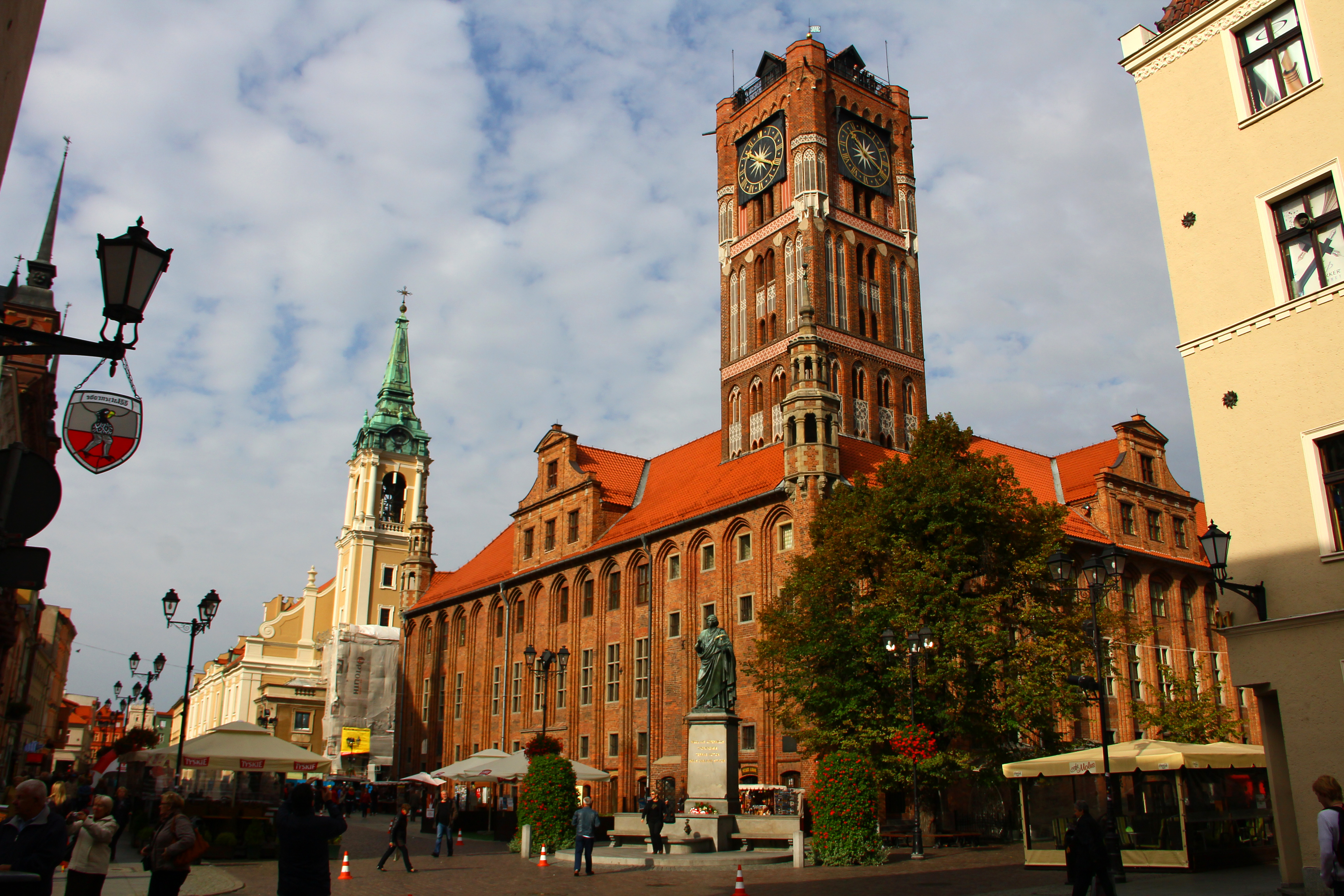
For hundreds of years, Toruń has remained the largest city in the Chełmno Land.

Toruń was the birthplace of the renowned astronomer Nicolaus Copernicus in 1473, and place of death of Polish King John I Albert in 1501. Lubawa was the place where the decision was made to publish Copernicus' groundbreaking work De revolutionibus orbium coelestium. In 1528, the royal mint started operating in Toruń. Toruń was the location of the Sejm of the Polish–Lithuanian Commonwealth (parliament) in 1576 and 1626, and the Colloquium Charitativum, a three-month congress of European Catholics, Lutherans, and Calvinists, considered an important event in the history of interreligious dialogue, held in 1645 on the initiative of King Władysław IV Vasa at a time when religious conflicts occurred in many other European countries and the disastrous Thirty Years' War was fought west of Poland.

The most prominent educational institutions of the Chełmno Land were the Academic Gymnasium in Toruń, founded in 1594 from a former municipal school, and the Chełmno Academy in Chełmno, transformed from a local gymnasium in 1692, which in 1756 became a branch of the Jagiellonian University in Kraków, the oldest and leading Polish university. Grzegorz Gerwazy Gorczycki, one of the greatest Polish Baroque composers, was a lecturer at the Chełmno Academy in the 1690s.

In 1772 as a result of the First Partition of Poland, Chełmno Land (with the exception of Toruń, annexed in 1793) was seized by the Kingdom of Prussia. Between 1807 and 1815 Chełmno Land was a part of the Polish Duchy of Warsaw and Toruń was even the duchy's temporary capital in April and May 1809. In 1815 it was annexed by Prussia again, first it became part of the Grand Duchy of Posen, but in 1817 was incorporated into the province of West Prussia. The local Polish population organized resistance against the Germanisation policies of Prussia. Also as part of anti-Polish policies, the Prussians expelled the Kraków professors from Chełmno and abolished the Chełmno Academy. Pan Tadeusz, epic poem by Adam Mickiewicz, was first printed in partitioned Poland in Toruń in 1858. In 1875 the Polish Scientific Society in Toruń was founded, one of the leading such organizations in partitioned Poland.

In 1878, renowned Polish surgeon Ludwik Rydygier opened his private clinic in Chełmno, where he conducted pioneering surgical operations, including the first in Poland and second in the world surgical removal of the pylorus in a patient suffering from stomach cancer in 1880 and the first in the world peptic ulcer resection in 1881, however, in 1887, he sold the clinic to one of his employees, Leon Polewski, due to harassment from the Prussian authorities.

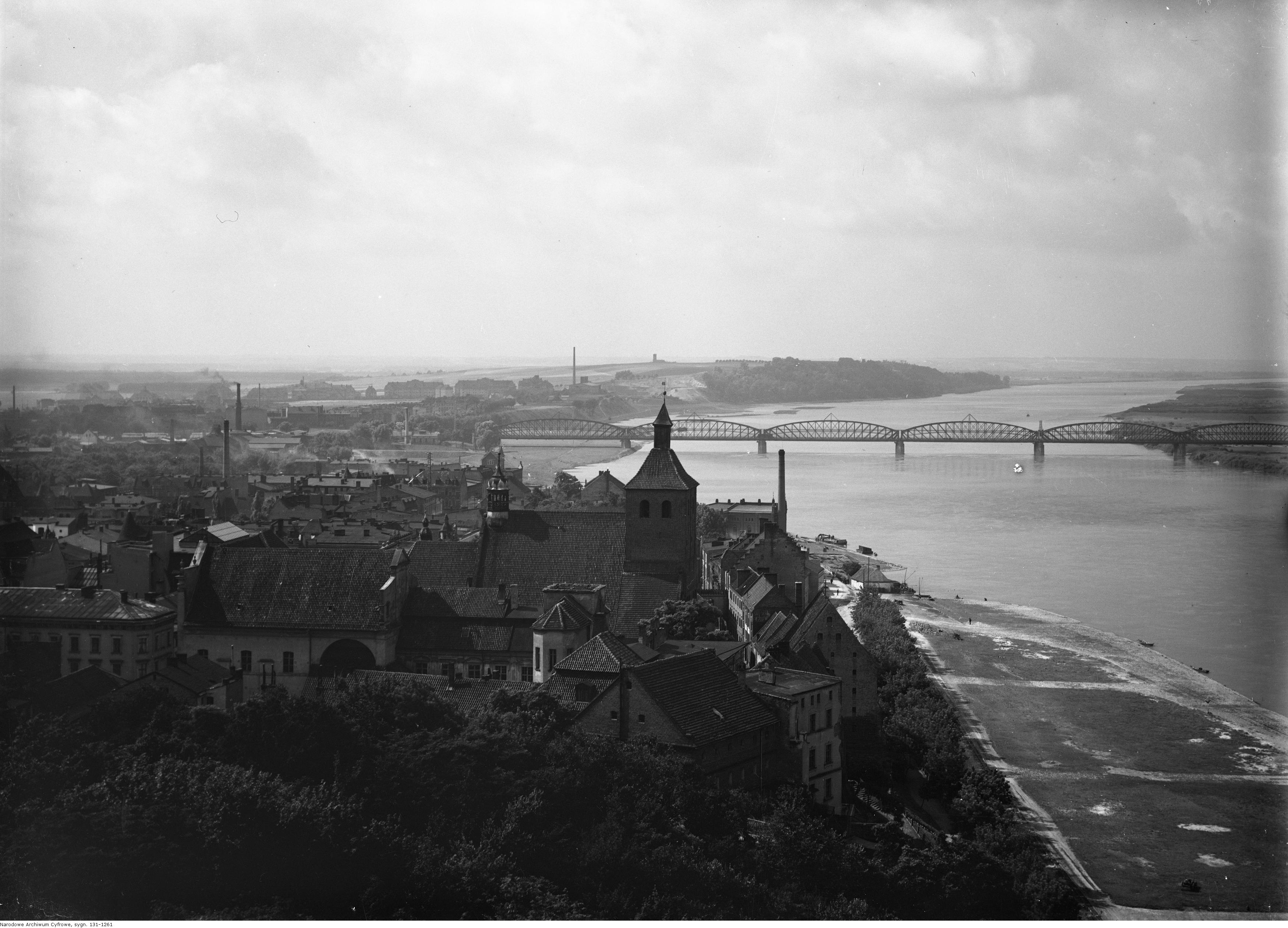
Cityscape of Grudziądz in 1928

Following the Treaty of Versailles, Chełmno Land was returned to Poland in January 1920, after the Poles regained independence in 1918. In August 1920, Poland repulsed a Soviet invasion at Brodnica. In the interwar period it formed the southern part of the Pomeranian Voivodeship with the capital in Toruń.

=== World War II ===
Following the invasion of Poland, which started World War II in September 1939, it was occupied by Nazi Germany and unilaterally annexed in October, however, lacking any international recognition. During the occupation, the Polish population was subjected to various crimes, incl. mass arrests, imprisonment, slave labor, kidnapping of children, deportations to Nazi concentration camps and extermination. The Germans carried out the Intelligenzaktion, a planned mass murder of the local Polish elites. Major sites of massacres of Poles in the region included Klamry, Łopatki, Barbarka, Brzezinki, Małe Czyste, Płutowo and Nawra. Already in autumn of 1939, about 23,000 Poles of the pre-war Pomeranian Voivodeship were murdered. In 1940–1943, Toruń was the location of a transit camp for Poles expelled from the region, which became infamous for inhuman sanitary conditions.

Nevertheless, the Polish resistance movement was still organized in the region, with Toruń being the seat of one of the six main commands of the Union of Armed Struggle in all of occupied Poland. In January 1945 it was captured by the Red Army and the German occupation of this part of Poland ended.

== Cities and towns ==
The region is currently inhabited by around 650,000 people. There are 14 cities and towns in the region. The largest are Toruń and Grudziądz.

- Brodnica
- Chełmno
- Chełmża
- Golub-Dobrzyń
- Grudziądz
- Jabłonowo Pomorskie
- Kowalewo Pomorskie

- Lidzbark
- Lubawa
- Łasin
- Nowe Miasto Lubawskie
- Radzyń Chełmiński
- Toruń
- Wąbrzeźno

== Sights ==
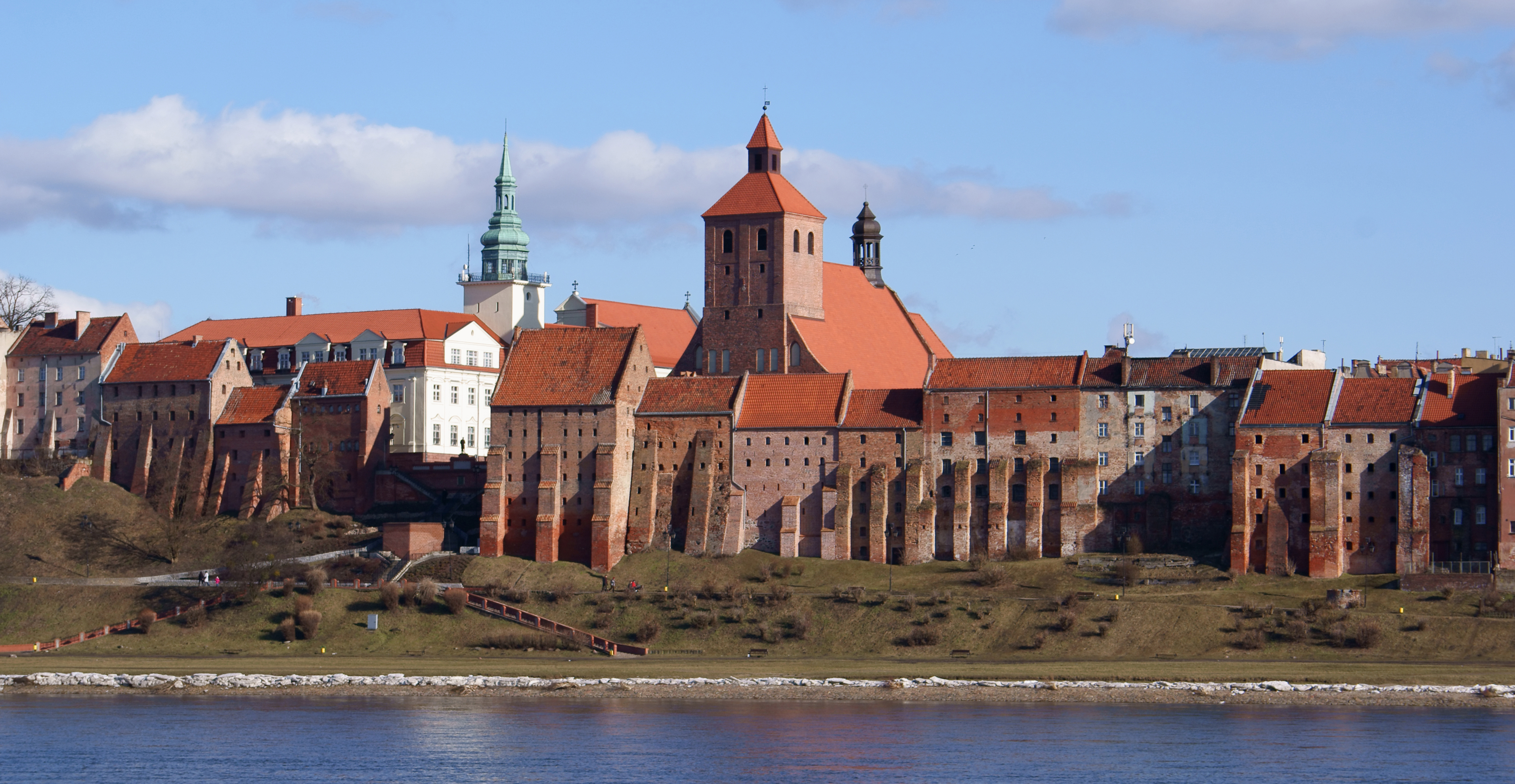
Grudziądz Granaries, one of the region's most famous landmarks

In 1997 the Medieval Town of Toruń was designated a UNESCO World Heritage Site and in 2007 Toruń's historic center was added to the list of Seven Wonders of Poland. Other most valuable heritage sites include the Old Town of Chełmno and the Grudziądz Granaries, both listed alongside Toruń as Historic Monuments of Poland, the most important cultural heritage monuments in the country.

The region is rich in historic architecture ranging from Gothic architecture to Renaissance, Baroque, Neoclassical and Art Nouveau. There are also several castles, including Golub, Radzyń Chełmiński, Świecie, Zamek Bierzgłowski, and palaces, including Jabłonowo and Ostromecko. Locations of historic monasteries include Chełmno, Grudziądz and Rywałd.

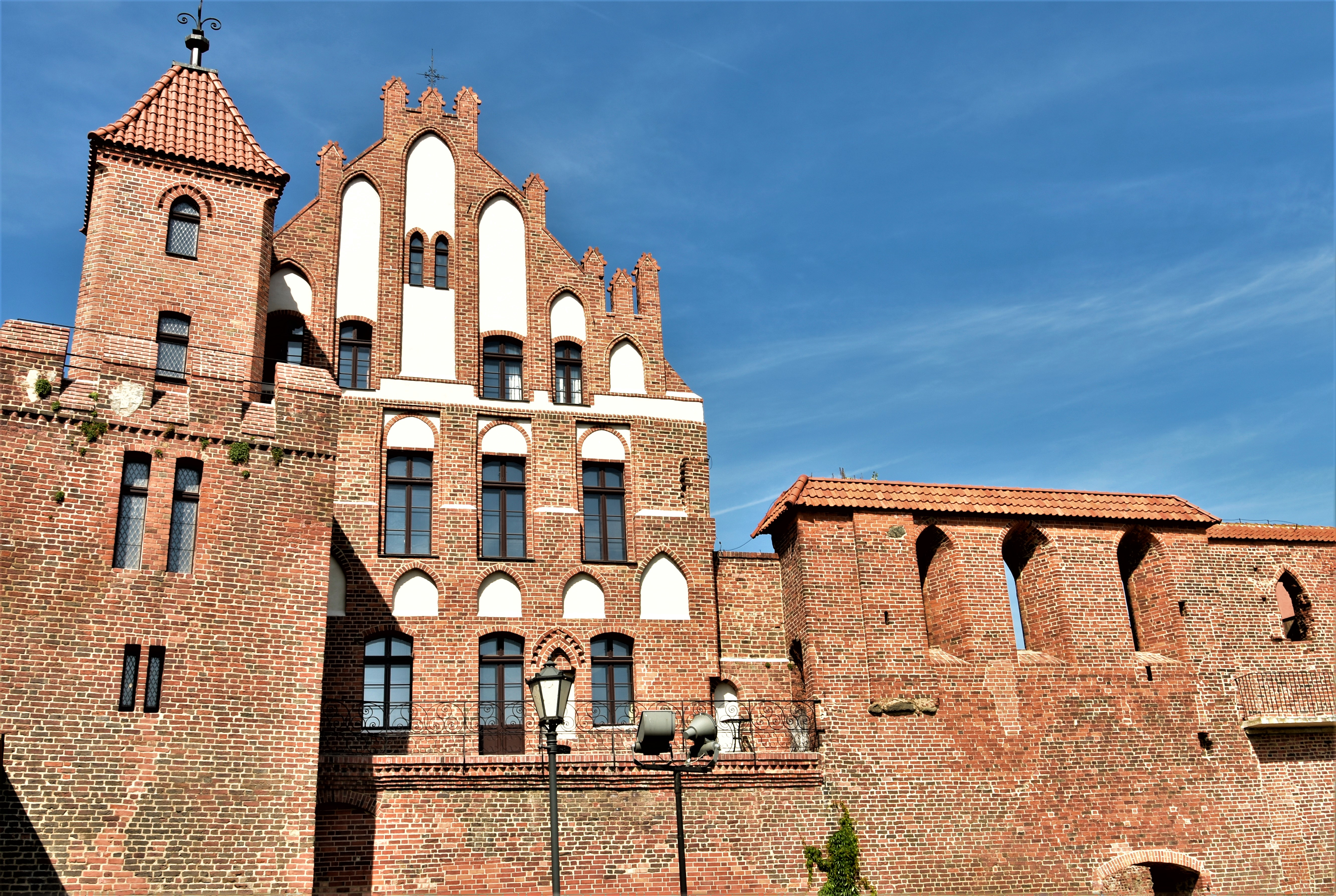
Medieval St. George Guildhall in Toruń

The District Museum in Toruń is a major museum with several branches, including the Copernicus House in Toruń, museum dedicated to Nicolaus Copernicus, the Museum of Toruń Gingerbread, the Museum of Far Eastern Art in the Star Tenement and the Tony Halik Museum of Travelers. The Museum of Chełmno Land with historical and art collections is located in Chełmno. The palace in Ostromecko contains the Andrzej Szwalbe Collection of Historical Pianos, one of two largest such collections in Poland.

There are numerous World War II memorials in the Chełmno Land, including memorials at the sites of Nazi massacres of Poles, including the largest massacres at Klamry, Łopatki, Barbarka, Brzezinki and Małe Czyste.

In Chełmno, there is a memorial to surgeon Ludwik Rydygier, the first surgeon in the world to carry out a peptic ulcer resection.

== Sports ==
The most successful and popular sports clubs in the region include motorcycle speedway teams KS Toruń and GKM Grudziądz, ice hockey team TKH Toruń and basketball teams Twarde Pierniki Toruń (men) and Energa Toruń (women). The Speedway Grand Prix of Poland, part of the Speedway Grand Prix, is held annually at the MotoArena Toruń in Toruń.

== Gallery ==
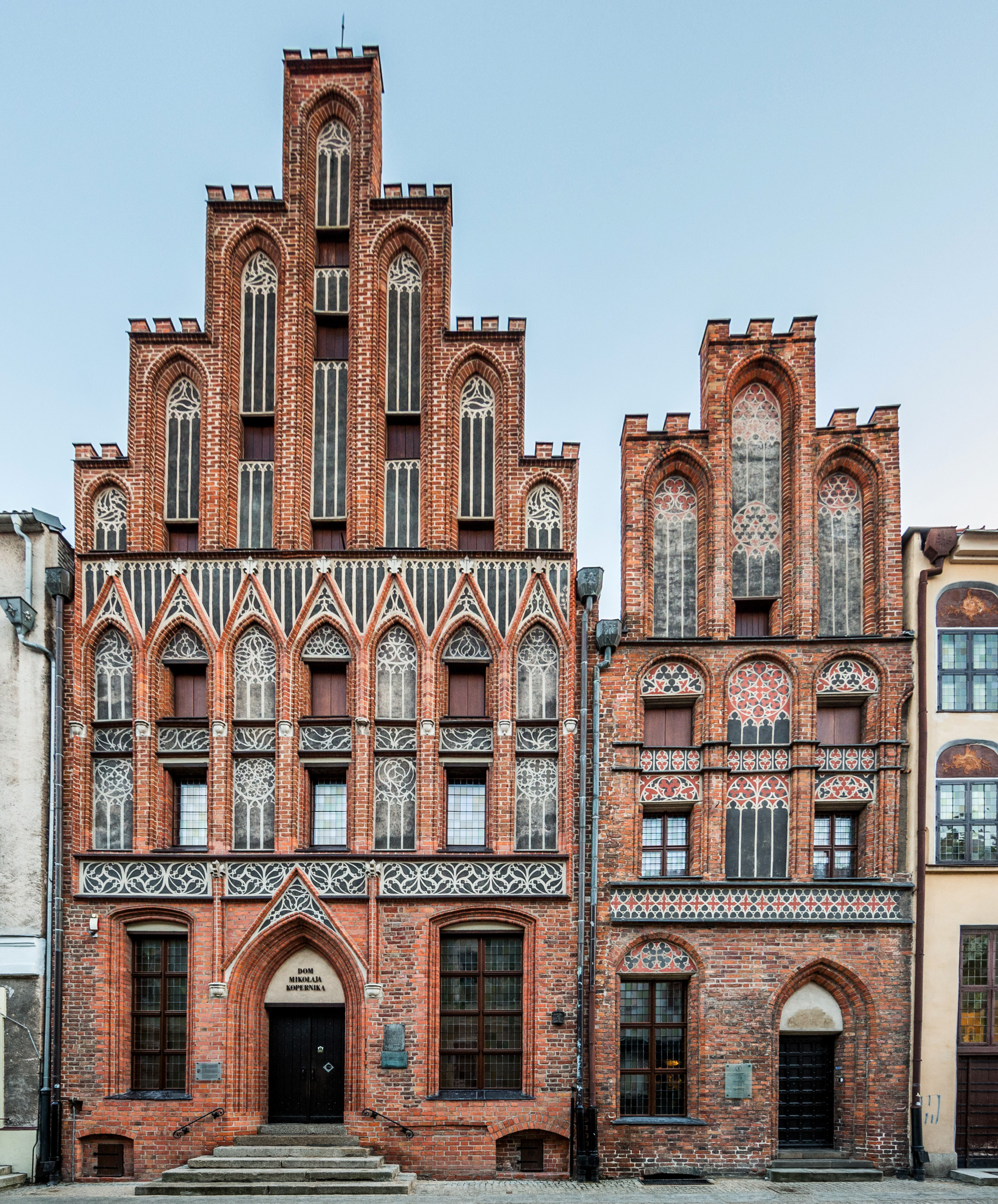
Copernicus' House in Toruń

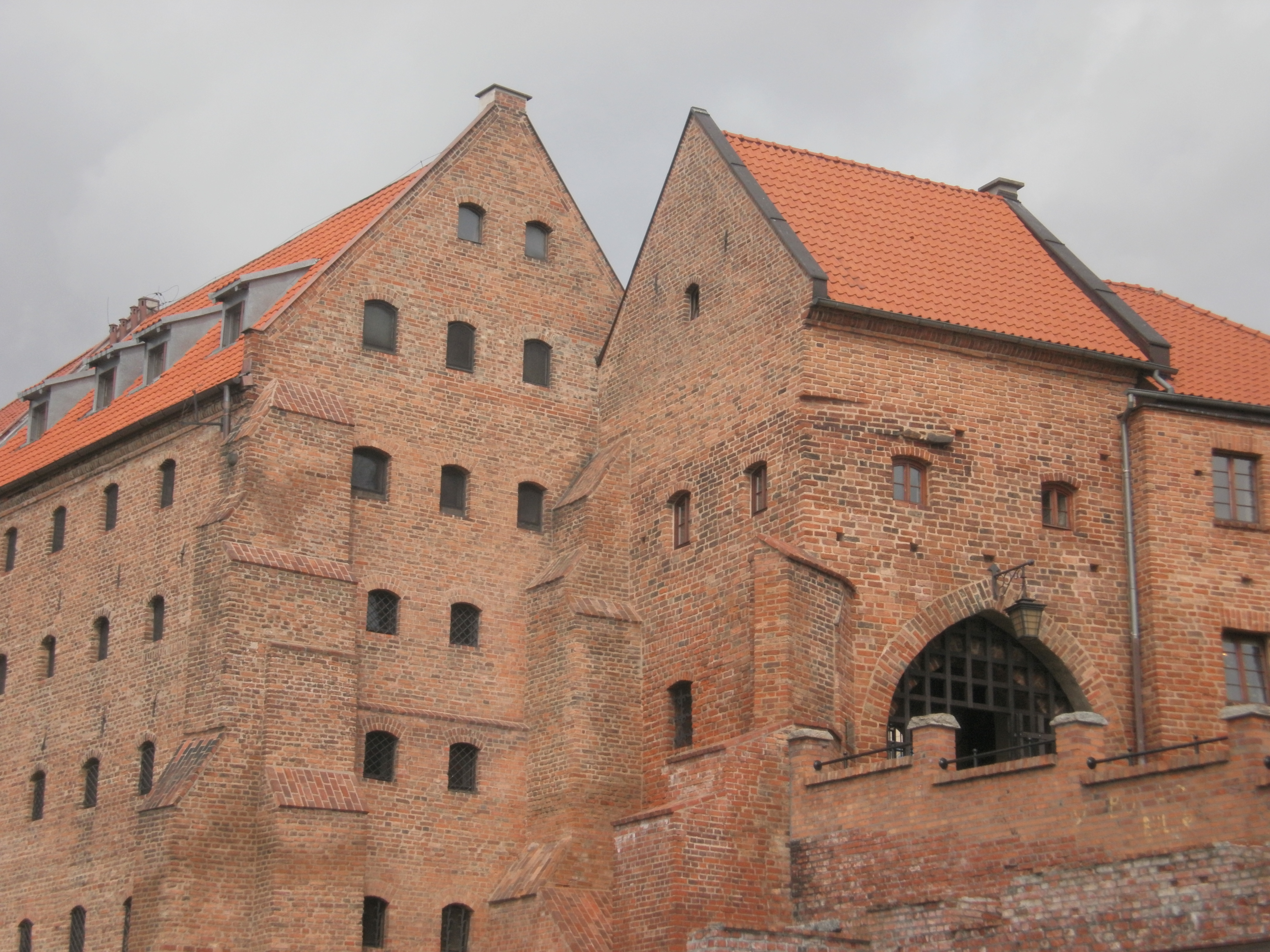
Water Gate in Grudziądz

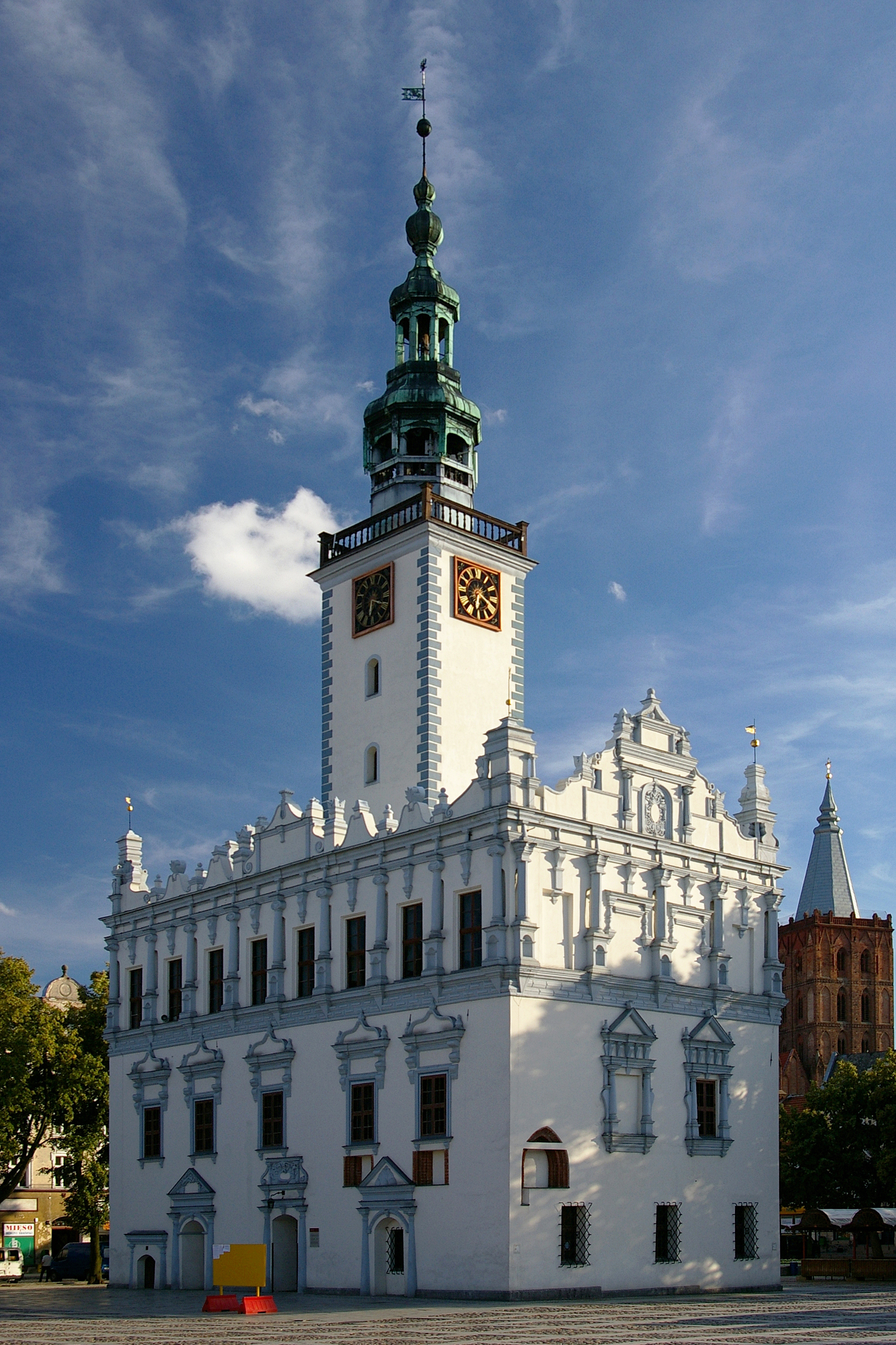
Renaissance Town Hall in Chełmno

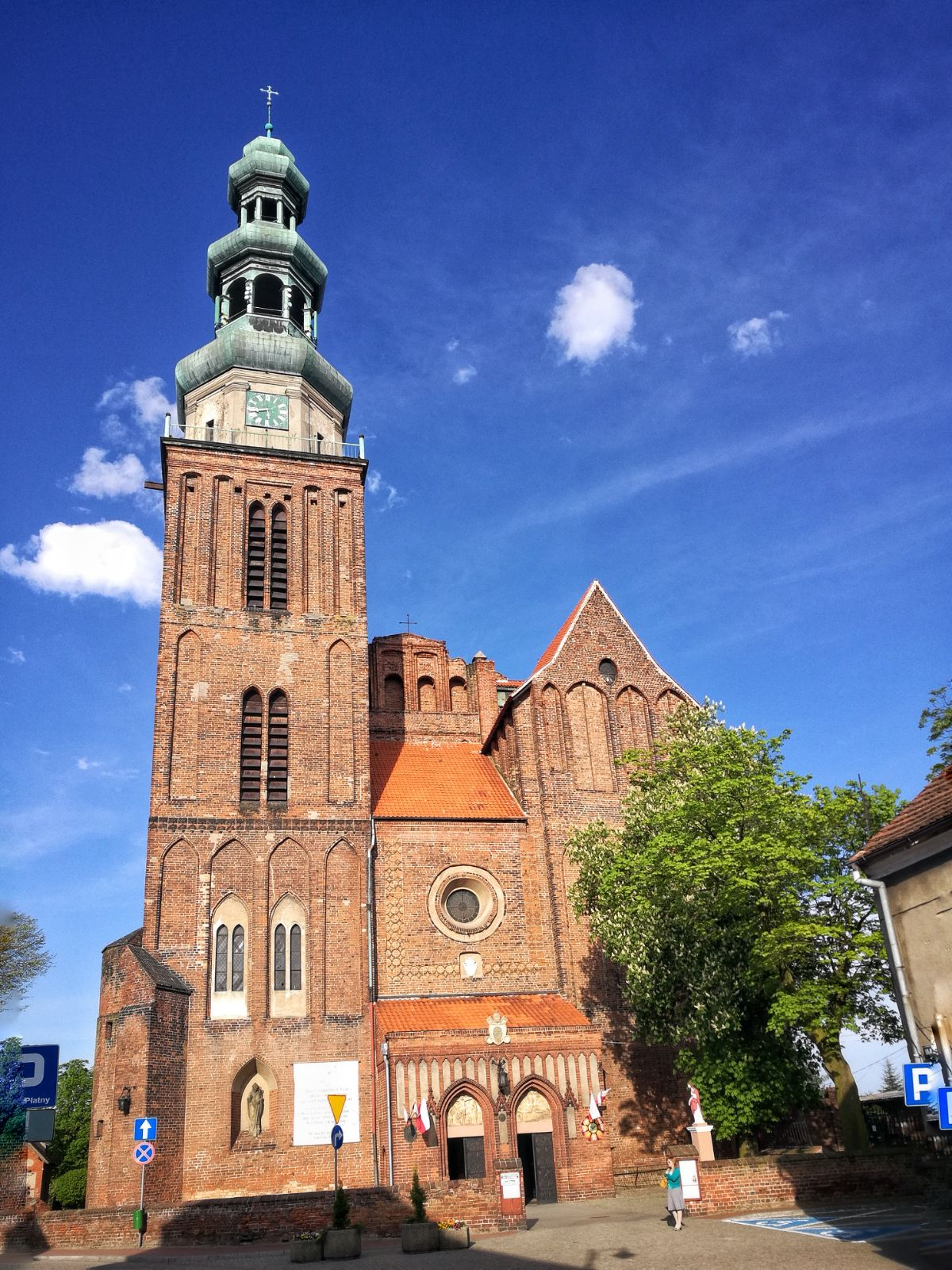
Co-Cathedral Basilica in Chełmża

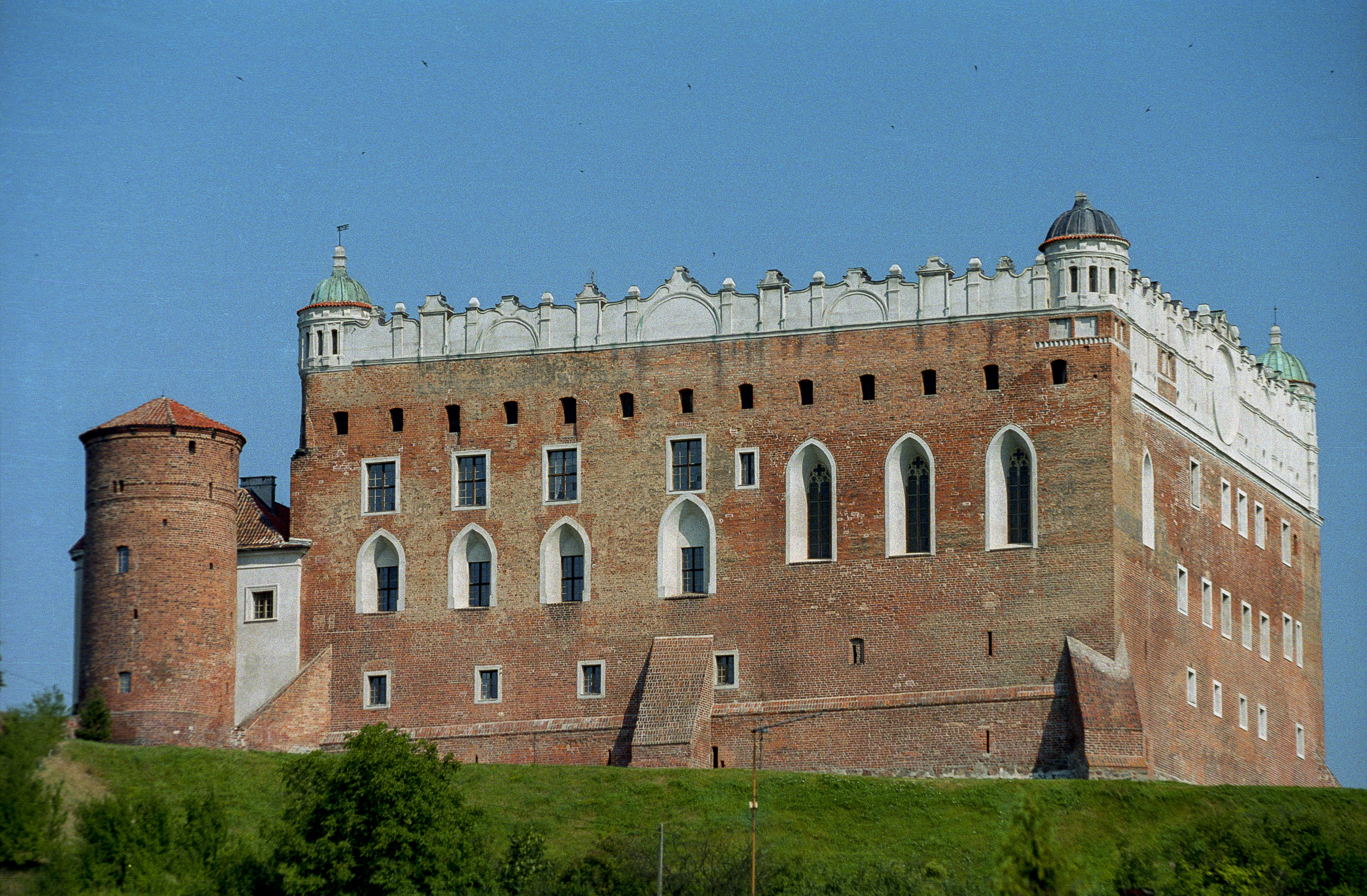
Golub Castle in Golub-Dobrzyń

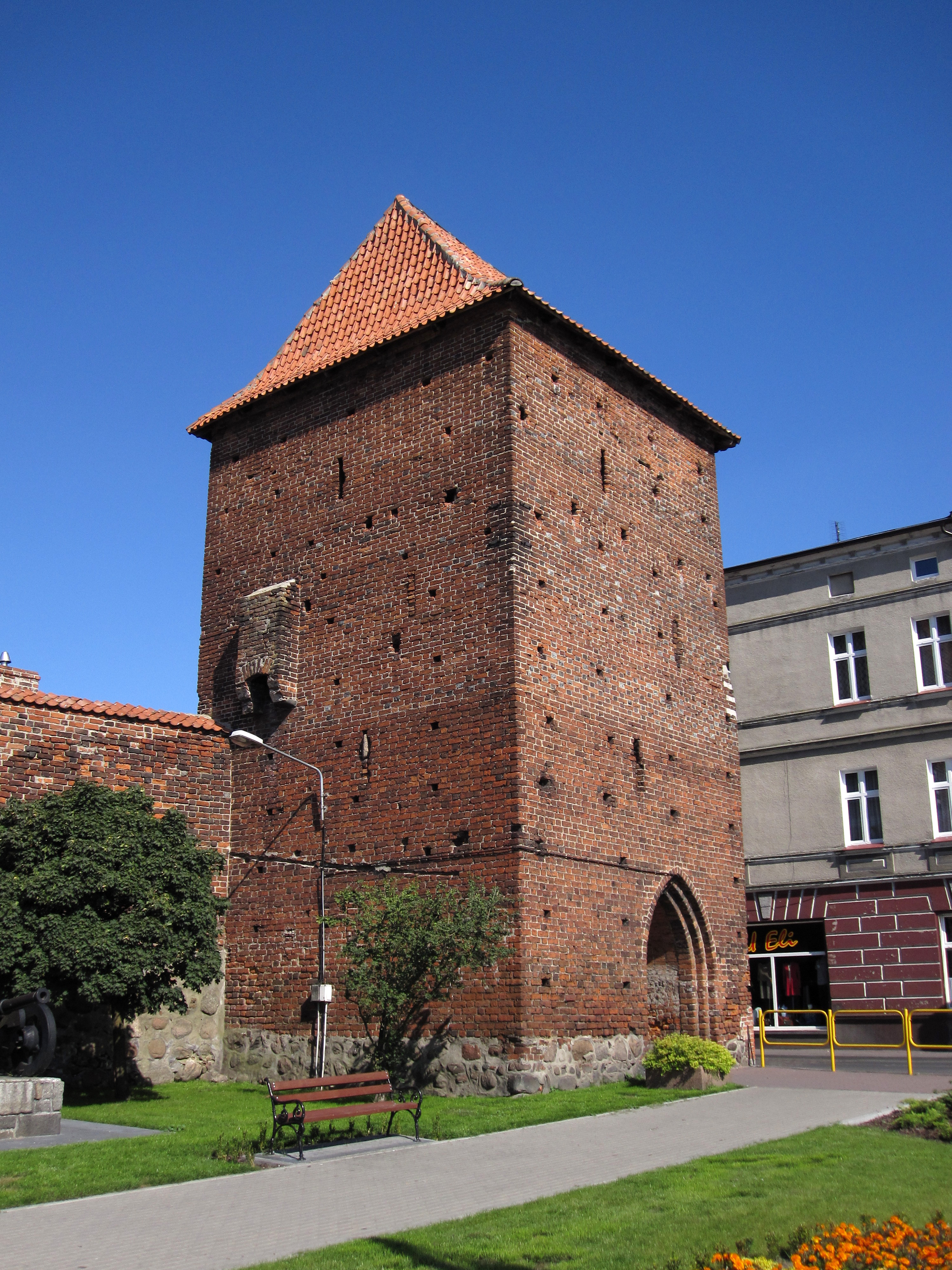
Brama Brodnicka (Brodnica Gate) in Nowe Miasto Lubawskie

== Bibliography ==
- Ziemia Chełmińska w przeszłości: wybór tekstów źródłowych [Chełmno Land in past: selection of source texts], ed. by Marian Biskup. Toruń 1961.
