= Kreis Znin =

Coordinates: 52°50′58″N 17°43′10″E

Location of Kreis Znin in the Province of Posen

Kreis Znin was one of many Kreise (counties) in the northern administrative region of Bromberg, in the Prussian province of Posen, from 1887-1919. Its capital was Znin.

== History ==
Kreis Znin was created in 1887 out of parts of Kreis Schubin, Kreis Mogilno, and Kreis Wongrowitz. The end of the 19th century was a period of intensive economic development for both urban and rural areas. A sugar factory was built in 1893-94.

Kreis Znin was part of the military command (German: Bezirkskommando) at Gnesen (Gniezno). The main court (German: Landgericht) was in Bromberg (Bydgoszcz), with a lower court (German: Amtsgericht) in the capital city Znin. Each of the cities Gonsawa, Janowitz, Rogowo, and Znin held headquarters of a police district (German: Polizeidistrikt).

Rebels from the territory participated in the Greater Poland Uprising in 1919 after World War I. The Kreis was dissolved in 1919 when the territory became part of the Second Polish Republic. During World War II, the territory of the former Kreis became Landkreis Dietfurt (Wartheland), 1939-1945.

== Demographics ==
According to the census of 1910, the district had a population of 40,210, of which 29,156 (72.51%) spoke Polish, 10,906 (27.12%) spoke German and 133 (0.33%) identified as bilingual.

== Transportation ==
A narrow-gauged railway line of the Prussian Eastern Railway through Żnin was completed from 1894-95. The first section of the 600 mm gauge Kleinbahn des Kreises Znin (local line of Znin County) opened from Znin to Rogowo (19.4 km) on 1 July 1894, together with a branch from Biskupin through Gąsawa to Szelejewo (8.2 km). On 9 June 1895 the Rogowo line was extended by 12.3 km to Ośno. In 1908 a branch to Ostrowce was added, and in 1911 a further 15.8 km branch opened to Obiecanowo. In the following year another 5.5 km branch opened to Wola, and in 1913 the Szelejewo line was extended to Grochowiska Szlacheckie. Finally, a 2 km section from Obiecanowo to Żużoły brought the system up to 78 km.

On 1 June 1889, a railway connection to the regular railway network was completed. This provided direct trains to Hohensalza (Inowrocław), Damasławek, and Rogasen (Rogoźno). By 1 November 1895 it was also connected to Bromberg.

The Wenecja Railway Museum opened in 1972, and contains a collection of at least 17 steam locomotives and a variety of rolling stock and other items. It is situated beside the railway, but the display tracks are not connected to the running lines. The railway also runs past the archaeological museum at Biskupin.

== Standesämter ==
Standesamt is the German name of the local civil registration offices which were established in October 1874 soon after the German Empire was formed. Births, marriages and deaths were recorded. Previously, only duplicate copies of church records were used. By 1905, Kreis Znin had the following 13 offices for rural residents:

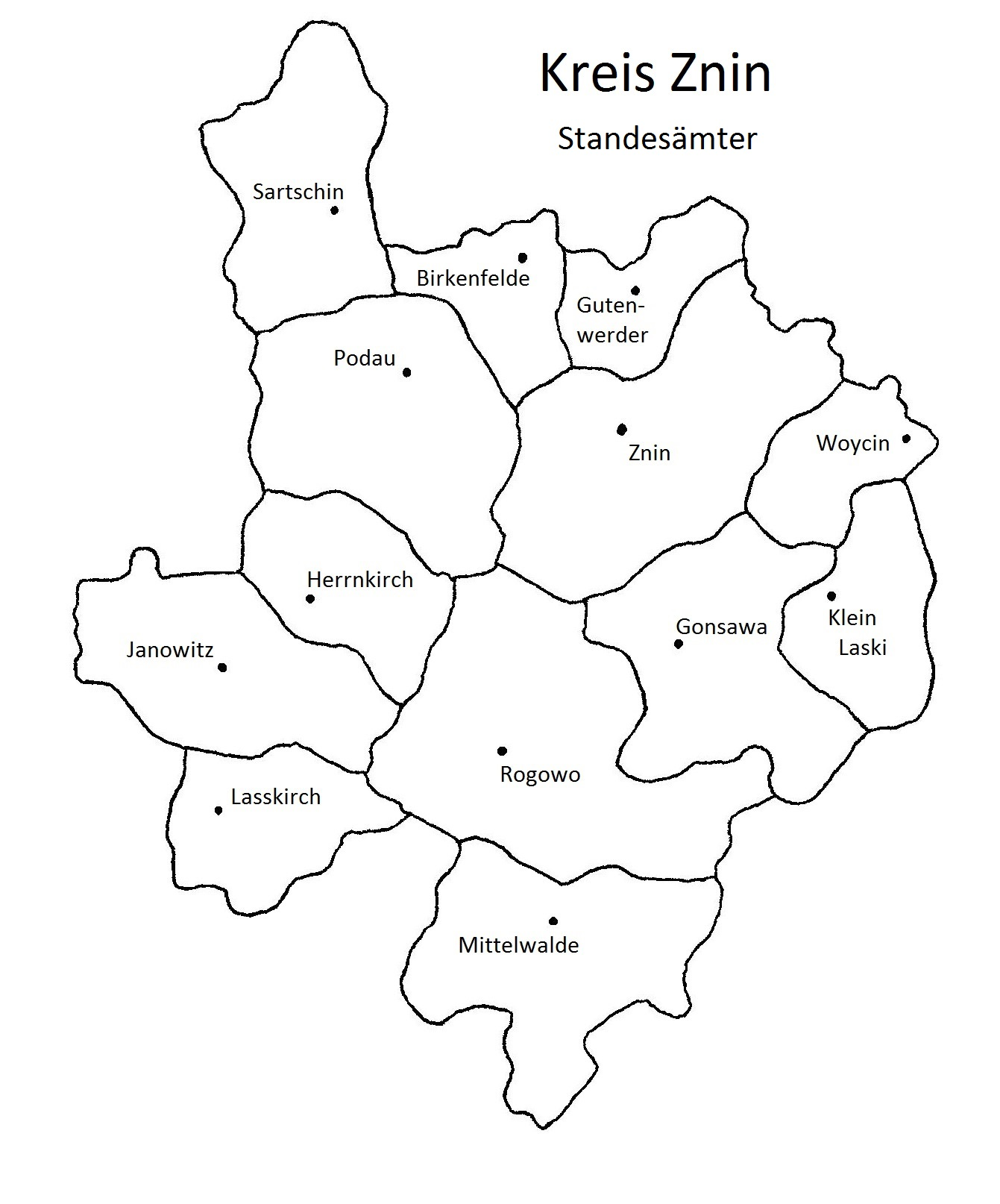
The standesämter districts of Kreis Znin, Provinz Posen, Prussia/Germany

Standesamt	Polish Name
Birkenfelde	Brzyskorzystew
Gonsawa	Gąsawa
Gutenwerder	Dobrylewo
Herrnkirch	Zrazim
Janowitz	Janowiec Wielkopolski
Klein Laski	Laski Małe
Lasskirch	Laskowo
Mittelwalde	Mięcierzyn
Podau	Podobowice
Rogowo	Rogowo
Sartschin	Żarczyn
Woycin	Wójcin
Znin	Żnin

Gutenwerder district was created in 1876 from Znin district (Schubin County). Mittelwalde district was created in 1890 from Rogowo district and Klein Laski district was created from Gonsawa district. Herrnkirch district was created in 1899 from Janowitz district. Birkenfelde district was created from Gutenwerder district. Lasskirch district was created in 1905 from Janowitz district and Woycin district was created from Znin district. In addition, the following cities were separate districts for urban residents: Rogowo, Znin.

== List of communities ==
Communities	Polish Name	Standesamt
Bekanowo	Bekanówka	Birkenfelde
Birkenfelde	Brzyskorzystew	Birkenfelde
Dochanowo	Dochanowo	Birkenfelde
Marienwalde		Birkenfelde
Paulshof		Birkenfelde
Sulinowo	Sulinowo	Birkenfelde
Biskupin	Biskupin	Gonsawa
Bölkamühle	Bełki	Gonsawa
Drewno	Drewno	Gonsawa
Folluschmühle	Folusz	Gonsawa
Glowy	Głowy	Gonsawa
Godawy	Godawy	Gonsawa
Gonsawa	Gąsawa	Gonsawa
Gonsawka Mühle		Gonsawa
Kiebitzbruch		Gonsawa
Komratowo	Komratowo	Gonsawa
Lysinin	Łysinin	Gonsawa
Marcinkowo dolne	Marcinkowo Dolne	Gonsawa
Marcinkowo gorne	Marcinkowo Górne	Gonsawa
Ocwieka	Oćwieka	Gonsawa
Osinin		Gonsawa
Pniewy	Pniewy	Gonsawa
Propsteivorwerk	Probostwo	Gonsawa
Rozagora		Gonsawa
Schelejewo	Szelejewo	Gonsawa
Schelejewo Buden		Gonsawa
Schramma Mühle		Gonsawa
Venetia	Wenecja	Gonsawa
Welkenhof		Gonsawa
Brzyskorzystewko	Brzyskorzystewko	Gutenwerder
Gutenwerder	Dobrylewo	Gutenwerder
Jaroschewo	Jaroszewo	Gutenwerder
Lawrenzhof	Wawrzynki	Gutenwerder
Obersee	Wilczkowo	Gutenwerder
Rettschütz	Redczyce	Gutenwerder
Sophienfelde	Daronice	Gutenwerder
Herrnkirch	Zrazim	Herrnkirch
Marienfeld	Obiecanowo	Herrnkirch
Skorken	Skórki	Herrnkirch
Tonndorf	Tonowo	Herrnkirch
Welna	Wełna	Herrnkirch
Wiesensee	Żużoły	Herrnkirch
Zerniki	Żerniki	Herrnkirch
Bilau	Bielawy	Janowitz
Brudzin	Brudzyń	Janowitz
Dembietz	Dębiec	Janowitz
Dziekczyn	Dziekszyn	Janowitz
Janowitz	Janowiec Wielkopolski	Janowitz
Koldromb	Kołdrąb	Janowitz
Kopiec		Janowitz
Lapay	Łapaj	Janowitz
Poslau	Posługowo	Janowitz
Puzdrowitz	Puzdrowiec	Janowitz
Robertowo		Janowitz
Sarbinowko	Sarbinowko	Janowitz
Wloschanowo	Włoszanowo	Janowitz
Wybranowo	Wybranowo	Janowitz
Annowo	Annowo	Klein Laski
Eitelsdorf	Nowa Wieś Pałucka	Klein Laski
Friedrichswalde	Laski Wielkie	Klein Laski
Grzmionca	Grzmiąca	Klein Laski
Klein Laski	Laski Małe	Klein Laski
Komsdorf	Chomiąża Szlachecka	Klein Laski
Obudno	Obudno	Klein Laski
Ostrowce	Ostrówce	Klein Laski
Piastowo	Piastowo	Klein Laski
Rosalinowo	Rozalinowo	Klein Laski
Wiktorowo	Wiktorowo	Klein Laski
Gontsch	Gącz	Lasskirch
Kwasuty		Lasskirch
Lasskirch	Laskowo	Lasskirch
Minchau	Miniszewo	Lasskirch
Oschnau	Ośno	Lasskirch
Retsch	Recz	Lasskirch
Schwichowo		Lasskirch
Biskupitzmühle	Biskupiec	Mittelwalde
Bozacin	Bożacin	Mittelwalde
Budzislaw	Budzisław	Mittelwalde
Cegielnia	Cegielnia	Mittelwalde
Coton	Cotoń	Mittelwalde
Fennbrück	Gołaźnia	Mittelwalde
Goscheschin	Gościeszyn	Mittelwalde
Goscheschinek	Gościeszynek	Mittelwalde
Jeziora	Jeziora	Mittelwalde
Langfurth	Długi Bród	Mittelwalde
Mittelwalde	Mięcierzyn	Mittelwalde
Rehhorst	Sarnówko	Mittelwalde
Sturmhof	Mięcierzyn-Leśniczówka	Mittelwalde
Bogdarka		Podau
Cerekwica	Cerekwica	Podau
Gorzyce	Gorzyce	Podau
Gosslerhof	Świątkowo	Podau
Juncewo	Juncewo	Podau
Katschkowo	Kaczkowo	Podau
Kornthal	Ustaszewo	Podau
Paryz	Paryż	Podau
Piotrkowitz	Piotrkowice	Podau
Podau	Podobowice	Podau
Rosenfelde	Słabomierz	Podau
Sielec	Sielec	Podau
Slawoschewo	Slawoszewo	Podau
Slembowo	Słębowo	Podau
Sommerfeld	Kaczkówko	Podau
Stawek		Podau
Swierczewo	Świerczewo	Podau
Wieneck	Uszikowo	Podau
Borek		Rogowo
Friedrichshöhe	Czewujewo	Rogowo
Galenschewo	Gałęzewo	Rogowo
Galensewko	Gałęzewko	Rogowo
Glembitz	Leśnictwo Głęboczek	Rogowo
Gostombka	Gostomka	Rogowo
Grochowiska (Adlig)	Grochowiska Szlacheckie	Rogowo
Grochowiska (Königlich)	Grochowiska Księże	Rogowo
Gutfelde	Złotniki	Rogowo
Hermannshof	Szkółki	Rogowo
Johannisgrün	Łaziska	Rogowo
Kerngrund	Leśnictwo Oćwieka	Rogowo
Kostkowo		Rogowo
Lubtsch	Lubcz	Rogowo
Lubtsch rudonek	Rudunek	Rogowo
Neitwalde	Niedźwiady	Rogowo
Ochodza (Adlig)		Rogowo
Ottensund	Izdebno	Rogowo
Narajewo		Rogowo
Roggenau	Rogówko	Rogowo
Rom	Rzym	Rogowo
Ryschewko	Ryszewko	Rogowo
Ryschewo	Ryszewo	Rogowo
Taubenwalde	Nadleśnictwo Gołąbki	Rogowo
Ustron	Ustroń	Rogowo
Viktorowo	Wiktorowo	Rogowo
Weldin	Wiewiórczyn	Rogowo
Wola	Wola	Rogowo
Zalesie	Zalesie	Rogowo
Zurawiniec		Rogowo
Alexandrowo	Aleksandrowo	Sartschin
Birkholz		Sartschin
Clarashof	Nadborowo	Sartschin
Eckardtsfelde		Sartschin
Graboschewo	Graboszewo	Sartschin
Lindenbruck	Dziewierzewo	Sartschin
Ludwikowo		Sartschin
Miastowitz	Miastowice	Sartschin
Ruschetz	Rusiec	Sartschin
Sartschin	Żarczyn	Sartschin
Srebrnagora	Srebrna Góra	Sartschin
Chomionza (Geistlich)	Chomiąża Księża	Woycin
Jadownik	Jadowniki Rycerskie	Woycin
Kierschkowo	Kierzkowo	Woycin
Plebonka		Woycin
Woycin	Wójcin	Woycin
Balschau		Znin
Bergen		Znin
Bialoschewin	Białożewin	Znin
Boschwitz	Bożejewice	Znin
Bozejewiczki	Bożejewiczki	Znin
Gogulkowo	Gogółkowo	Znin
Gora	Góra	Znin
Januschkowo	Januszkowo	Znin
Murtschin	Murczyn	Znin
Podgorschin	Podgórzyn	Znin
Rydlewo	Rydlewo	Znin
Sarbinowo	Sarbinowo	Znin
Skarbinitz	Skarbienice	Znin
Wartenberg	Jadowniki Bielskie	Znin

== Church parishes ==
In 1905, these Catholic parish churches served towns in Kreis Znin:

Birkenfelde	Gorzyce	Janowitz	Lindenbrück	Ottensund	Srebrnagora
Cerekwica	Goscheschin	Juncewo	Lopienno	Rogowo	Venetia
Gonsawa	Goßlerhof	Koldromb	Lubtsch	Ryschewko	Zerniki
Gora	Hedwigshorst	Komsdorf	Niestronno	Schepanowo	Znin

In 1905, these Protestant parish churches served towns in Kreis Znin:

Bartschin	Hallkirch	Josephowo	Lindenbrück	Znin
Exin	Herrnkirch	Kaisersfelde	Rogowo	
Groß Mirkowitz	Janowitz	Lasskirch	Zinsdorf	
