= Witold Hatka =

Polish politician (1939–2010)

Member of the Sejm of Poland
- In office IV term: 19 October 2001 – 18 October 2005; V term: 19 October 2005 – 4 November 2007

Personal details
- Born: 25 June 1939 Bydgoszcz
- Died: 13 November 2010 (aged 71) Załachowo
- Party: League of Polish Families

Witold Hatka (25 June 1939 – 13 November 2010) was a Polish politician who was a Member of the Sejm of the Republic of Poland twice (2001–05, 2005–07).

He was re-elected to the Sejm on 25 September 2005, getting 5856 votes in 4 Bydgoszcz district, as a candidate from the League of Polish Families list.

He was also a member of Sejm 2001-2005.

Hatka died in a car accident in Załachowo, Żnin County.

He was closely related to Stanisław Mikołajczyk, Polish Prime Minister in Exile (1943–44).

== See also ==
- Members of Polish Sejm 2005-2007
