= Wielki Sosnowiec =

- Village
- Location within Poland
- Coordinates: 52°59′56″N 17°52′21″E
- Country: Poland
- Voivodeship: Kuyavian-Pomeranian
- County: Żnin
- Gmina: Łabiszyn

Wielki Sosnowiec (Polish pronunciation: [ˈvjɛlkʲi sɔsˈnɔvjɛts]) is a village in the administrative district of Gmina Łabiszyn, within Żnin County, Kuyavian-Pomeranian Voivodeship, in north-central Poland.
