= Złotowo =

Złotowo may refer to the following places:

- Złotowo, Greater Poland Voivodeship (west-central Poland)
- Złotowo, Żnin County in Kuyavian-Pomeranian Voivodeship (north-central Poland)
- Złotowo, Masovian Voivodeship (east-central Poland)
- Złotowo, Chojnice County in Pomeranian Voivodeship (north Poland)
- Złotowo, Kościerzyna County in Pomeranian Voivodeship (north Poland)
- Złotowo, Malbork County in Pomeranian Voivodeship (north Poland)
- Złotowo, Warmian-Masurian Voivodeship (north Poland)
- Złotowo, West Pomeranian Voivodeship (north-west Poland)
