= Zdziersk =

- Village
- Location within Poland
- Coordinates: 52°56′3″N 17°54′55″E
- Country: Poland
- Voivodeship: Kuyavian-Pomeranian
- County: Żnin
- Gmina: Łabiszyn
- Population: 10

Zdziersk [zd͡ʑɛrsk] is a village in the administrative district of Gmina Łabiszyn, within Żnin County, Kuyavian-Pomeranian Voivodeship, in north-central Poland.
