= Kania, Kuyavian-Pomeranian Voivodeship =

Kania
- Village
- Location within Poland
- Coordinates: 52°54′6″N 17°57′22″E
- Country: Poland
- Voivodeship: Kuyavian-Pomeranian
- County: Żnin
- Gmina: Barcin
- Population: 246

Kania [ˈkaɲa] is a village in the administrative district of Gmina Barcin, within Żnin County, Kuyavian-Pomeranian Voivodeship, in north-central Poland.
