= Głęboczek =

Głęboczek may refer to:

- Głęboczek, Greater Poland Voivodeship (west-central Poland)
- Głęboczek, Konin County in Greater Poland Voivodeship (west-central Poland)
- Głęboczek, Gmina Chrostkowo in Kuyavian-Pomeranian Voivodeship (north-central Poland)
- Głęboczek, Nakło County in Kuyavian-Pomeranian Voivodeship (north-central Poland)
- Głęboczek, Żnin County in Kuyavian-Pomeranian Voivodeship (north-central Poland)
- Głęboczek, Gmina Skępe in Kuyavian-Pomeranian Voivodeship (north-central Poland)
- Głęboczek, Mogilno County in Kuyavian-Pomeranian Voivodeship (north-central Poland)
- Głęboczek, Lubusz Voivodeship (west Poland)
- Głęboczek, Podlaskie Voivodeship (north-east Poland)
- Głęboczek, West Pomeranian Voivodeship (north-west Poland)
