= Złotniki, Kuyavian-Pomeranian Voivodeship =

Złotniki
- Village
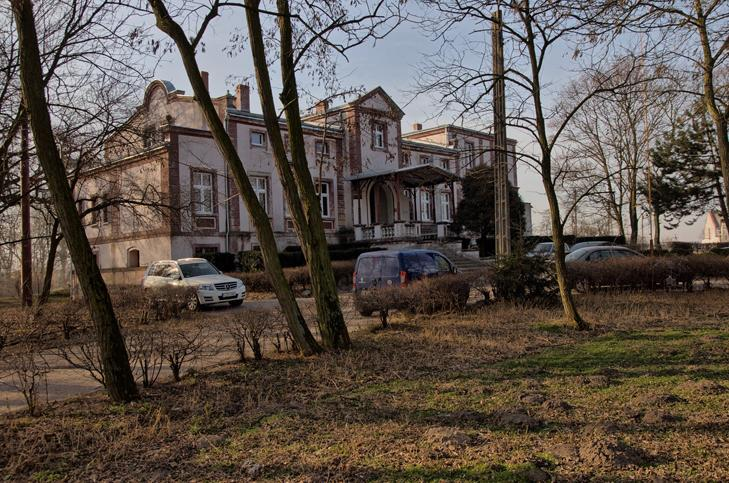

- Location within Poland
- Coordinates: 52°44′56″N 17°42′31″E
- Country: Poland
- Voivodeship: Kuyavian-Pomeranian
- County: Żnin
- Gmina: Rogowo

Złotniki [zwɔtˈniki] is a village in the administrative district of Gmina Rogowo, within Żnin County, Kuyavian-Pomeranian Voivodeship, in north-central Poland.
