= Pturek =

- Village
- Location within Poland
- Coordinates: 52°53′N 17°52′E
- Country: Poland
- Voivodeship: Kuyavian-Pomeranian
- County: Żnin
- Gmina: Barcin

Pturek [ˈpturɛk] is a village in the administrative district of Gmina Barcin, within Żnin County, Kuyavian-Pomeranian Voivodeship, in north-central Poland.
