= Annowo =

Annowo may refer to:

- Annowo, Grudziądz County in Kuyavian-Pomeranian Voivodeship (north-central Poland)
- Annowo, Gmina Gąsawa in Kuyavian-Pomeranian Voivodeship (north-central Poland)
- Annowo, Gmina Łabiszyn in Kuyavian-Pomeranian Voivodeship (north-central Poland)
- Annowo, Włocławek County in Kuyavian-Pomeranian Voivodeship (central Poland)
- Annowo, Masovian Voivodeship (north-central Poland)
- Annowo, Greater Poland Voivodeship (west-central Poland)
