= Biskupiec (disambiguation) =

Biskupiec is a town in Warmian-Masurian Voivodeship, north Poland.

Biskupiec may also refer to:

- Biskupiec, Nowe Miasto County, Warmian-Masurian Voivodeship
- Biskupiec, Kuyavian-Pomeranian Voivodeship (north-central Poland)

== See also ==
- Biskupice (disambiguation)
