= Włoszanowo =

- Village
- Location within Poland
- Coordinates: 52°46′15″N 17°29′30″E
- Country: Poland
- Voivodeship: Kuyavian-Pomeranian
- County: Żnin
- Gmina: Janowiec Wielkopolski

Włoszanowo [vwɔʂaˈnɔvɔ] is a village in the administrative district of Gmina Janowiec Wielkopolski, within Żnin County, Kuyavian-Pomeranian Voivodeship, in north-central Poland.
