= Bielawy, Gmina Janowiec Wielkopolski =

Bielawy
- Village
- Location within Poland
- Coordinates: 52°44′11″N 17°30′24″E
- Country: Poland
- Voivodeship: Kuyavian-Pomeranian
- County: Żnin
- Gmina: Janowiec Wielkopolski

Bielawy ([bjɛˈlavɨ]; German: Bilau) is a village in the administrative district of Gmina Janowiec Wielkopolski, within Żnin County, Kuyavian-Pomeranian Voivodeship, in north-central Poland.
