= Filip Padniewski =

Bishop of Kraków (1510–1572)

- Bishop of Krakow
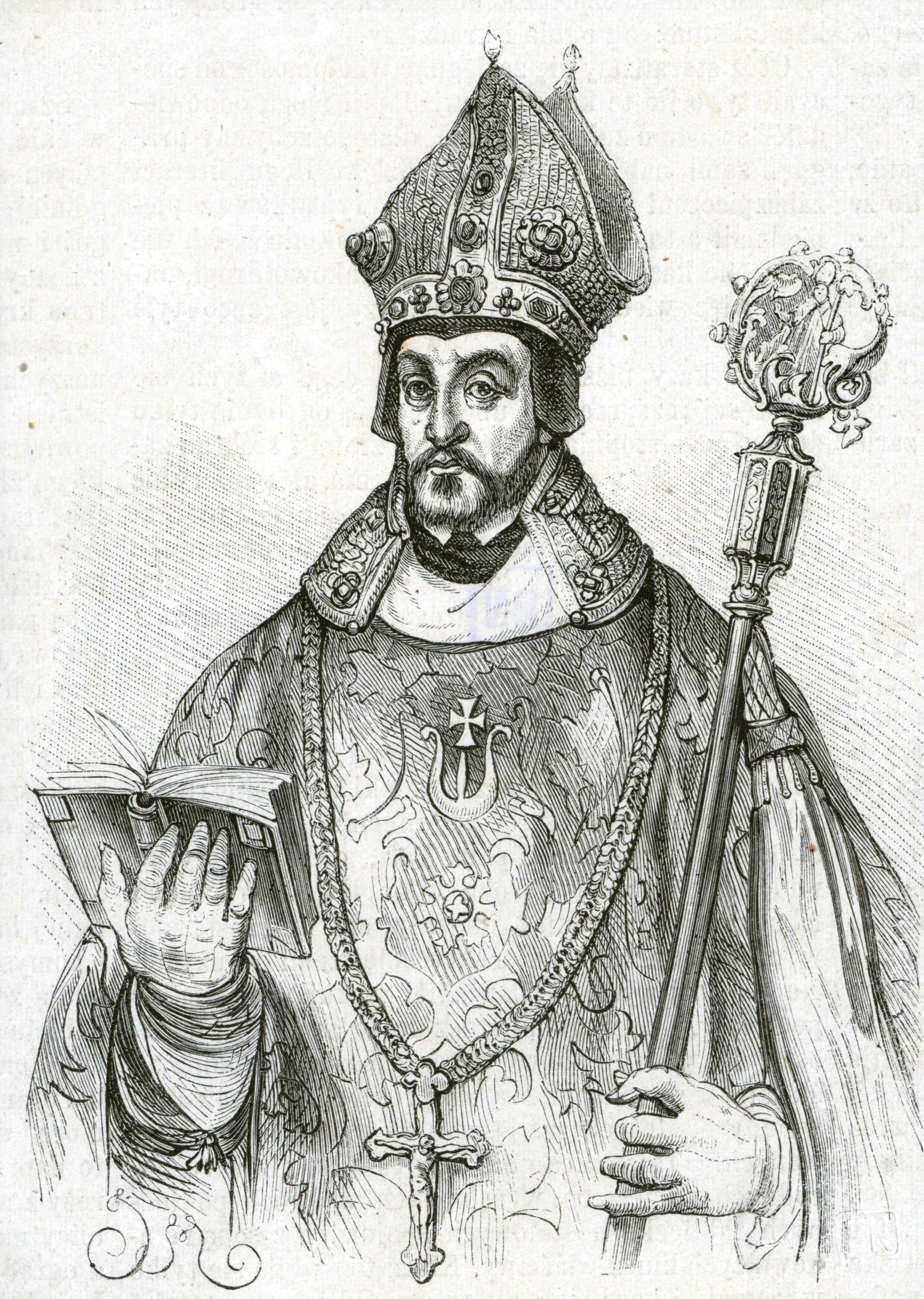
- Predecessor: Andrzej Zebrzydowski
- Successor: Franciszek Krasiński
- Previous posts: Bishop of Przemyśl, Vice-Chancellor, Royal Secretary to Vienna

Personal details
- Born: 1510
- Died: 17 April 1572 (aged 61–62)

Filip Padniewski (1510–1572) was a Polish orator and clergyman. He was Bishop of Przemyśl (1559) and Bishop of Kraków (1560-1572).

Filip Padniewski was born in 1510 in Skórki to Wojciech and Małgorzata of Żerniki, castellan of Kalisz.

Padniewski was heavily involved with the Union of Lublin and engaged in debate around the issues. He took certain staunch stances regarding the nature of the union, arguing that the union could only be mutually broken by the parties, Poland and Lithuania.

Padniewski was also a patron of poet Jan Kochanowski.

Sculptor Jan Michalowicz carved Padniewski's tomb.

== Legacy ==
Padniewski appears in Union of Lublin, a painting by Jan Matejko.

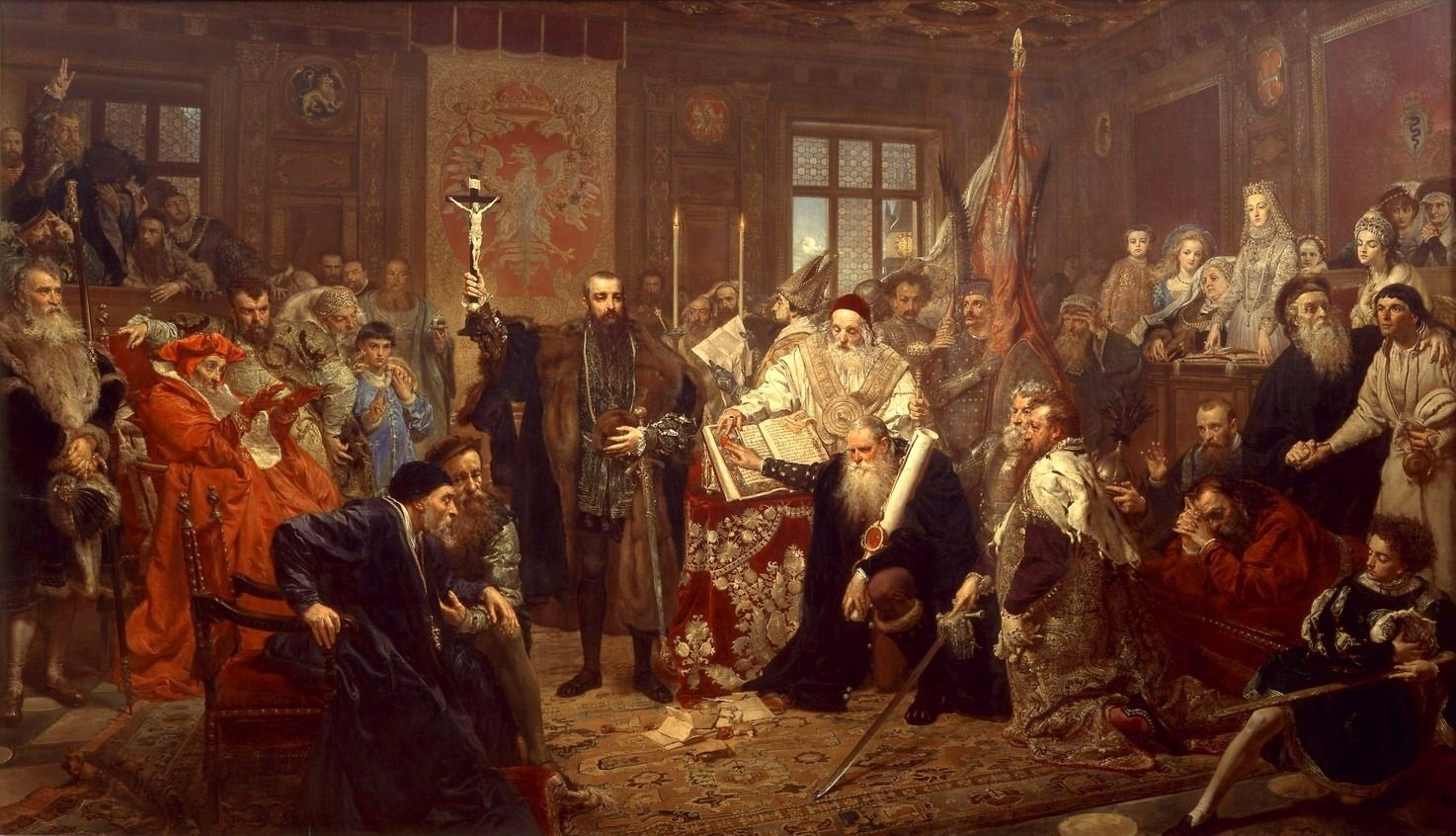
Center, wearing a mitre

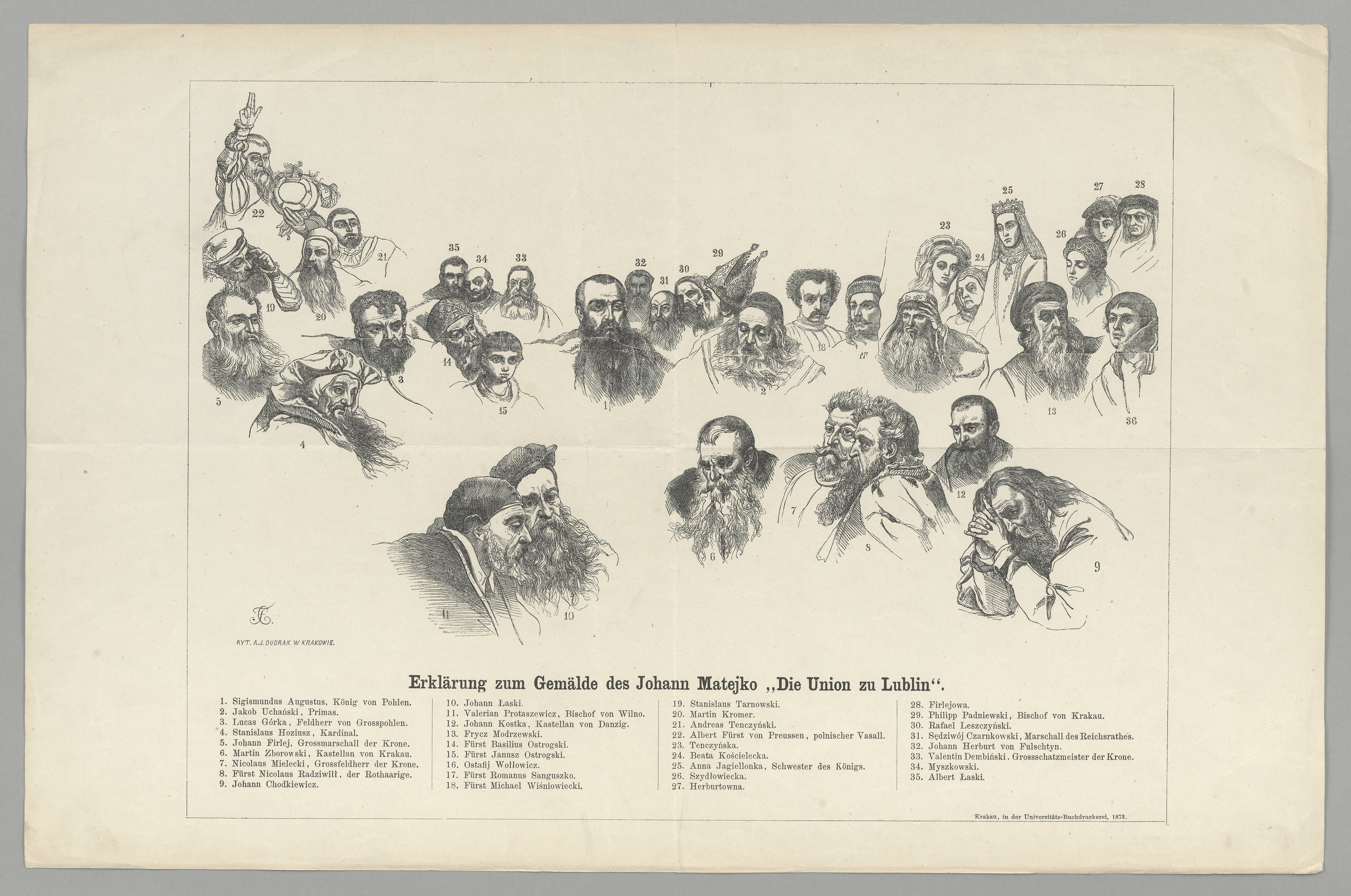
An artist's breakdown of Union of Lublin

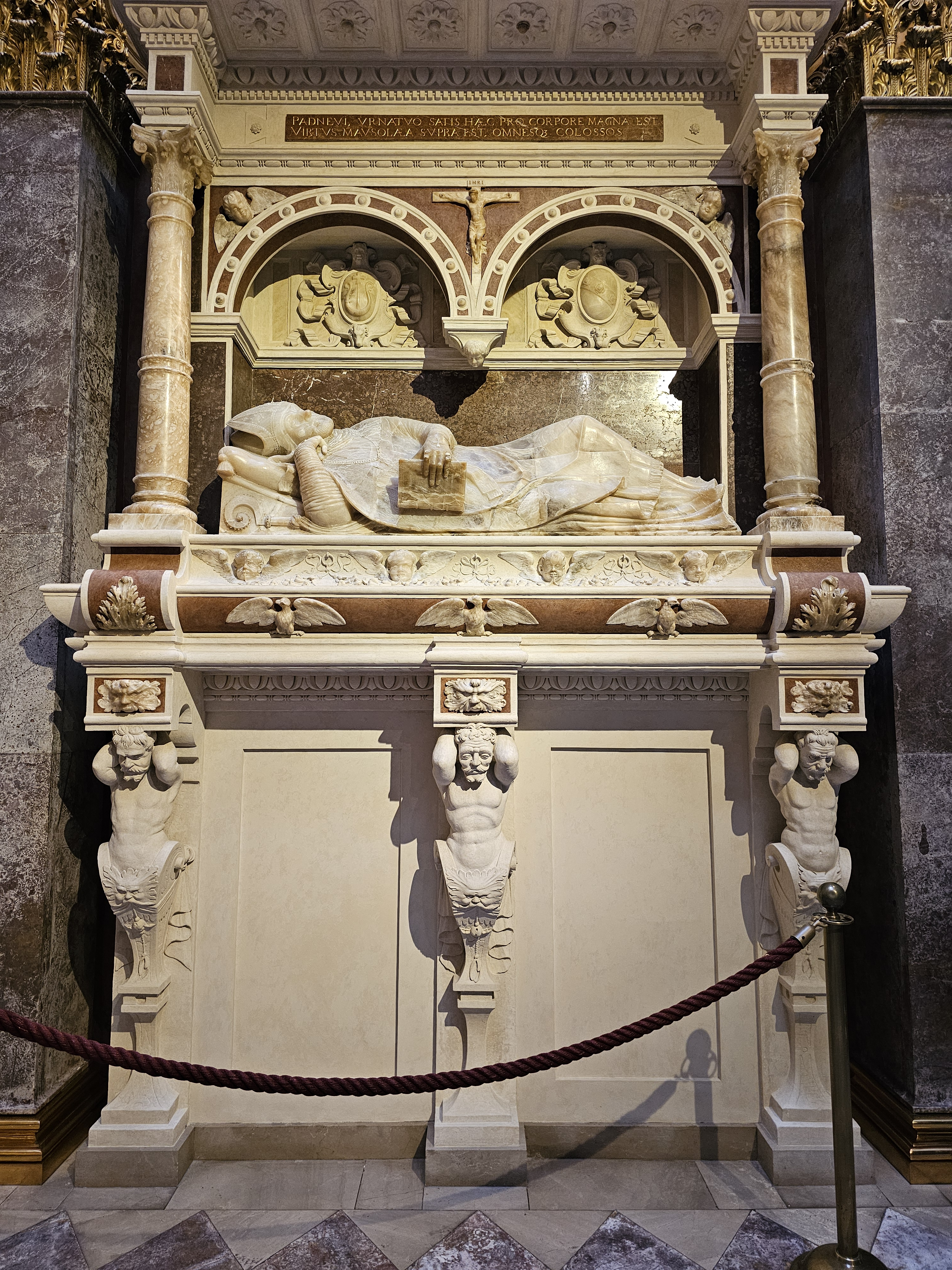
Padniewski tomb
