= Bielawy, Gmina Barcin =

Bielawy
- Village
- Location within Poland
- Coordinates: 52°50′06″N 18°00′44″E
- Country: Poland
- Voivodeship: Kuyavian-Pomeranian
- County: Żnin
- Gmina: Barcin

Bielawy ([bʲɛˈlavɨ]; German: Weißenhof) is a village in the administrative district of Gmina Barcin, within Żnin County, Kuyavian-Pomeranian Voivodeship, in north-central Poland.
