= Lubczynek =

- Village
- Location within Poland
- Coordinates: 52°41′25″N 17°40′51″E
- Country: Poland
- Voivodeship: Kuyavian-Pomeranian
- County: Żnin
- Gmina: Rogowo

Lubczynek [lupˈt͡ʂɨnɛk] is a village in the administrative district of Gmina Rogowo, within Żnin County, Kuyavian-Pomeranian Voivodeship, in north-central Poland.
