= Gącz =

- Village
- Location within Poland
- Coordinates: 52°42′48″N 17°30′01″E
- Country: Poland
- Voivodeship: Kuyavian-Pomeranian
- County: Żnin
- Gmina: Janowiec Wielkopolski

Gącz [ɡɔnt͡ʂ] is a village in the administrative district of Gmina Janowiec Wielkopolski, within Żnin County, Kuyavian-Pomeranian Voivodeship, in north-central Poland.
