= Gulczewo, Kuyavian-Pomeranian Voivodeship =

Gulczewo
- Village
- Location within Poland
- Coordinates: 52°54′38″N 17°58′26″E
- Country: Poland
- Voivodeship: Kuyavian-Pomeranian
- County: Żnin
- Gmina: Barcin
- Population: 101

Gulczewo [ɡulˈt͡ʂɛvɔ] is a village in the administrative district of Gmina Barcin, within Żnin County, Kuyavian-Pomeranian Voivodeship, in north-central Poland.
