= Puzdrowiec =

- Village
- Location within Poland
- Coordinates: 52°46′51″N 17°25′21″E
- Country: Poland
- Voivodeship: Kuyavian-Pomeranian
- County: Żnin
- Gmina: Janowiec Wielkopolski

Puzdrowiec [puzˈdrɔvjɛt͡s] is a village in the administrative district of Gmina Janowiec Wielkopolski, within Żnin County, Kuyavian-Pomeranian Voivodeship, in north-central Poland.
