= Szeroki Kamień =

- Village
- Location within Poland
- Coordinates: 52°48′N 18°0′E
- Country: Poland
- Voivodeship: Kuyavian-Pomeranian
- County: Żnin
- Gmina: Barcin

Szeroki Kamień (Polish pronunciation: [ʂɛˈrɔkʲi ˈkamjɛj̃]) is a village in the administrative district of Gmina Barcin, within Żnin County, Kuyavian-Pomeranian Voivodeship, in north-central Poland.
