= Gałęzewko =

- Village
- Location within Poland
- Coordinates: 52°43′01″N 17°40′47″E
- Country: Poland
- Voivodeship: Kuyavian-Pomeranian
- County: Żnin
- Gmina: Rogowo
- Population: 95

Gałęzewko [ɡawɛ̃ˈzɛfkɔ] is a village in the administrative district of Gmina Rogowo, within Żnin County, Kuyavian-Pomeranian Voivodeship, in north-central Poland.
