= Barcin-Wieś =

- Village
- Location within Poland
- Coordinates: 52°53′14″N 17°57′8″E
- Country: Poland
- Voivodeship: Kuyavian-Pomeranian
- County: Żnin
- Gmina: Barcin
- Population: 392

Barcin-Wieś [ˈbart͡ɕin ˈvʲɛɕ] is a village in the administrative district of Gmina Barcin, within Żnin County, Kuyavian-Pomeranian Voivodeship, in north-central Poland.
