= Jeziora, Kuyavian-Pomeranian Voivodeship =

Jeziora
- Village
- Location within Poland
- Coordinates: 52°39′42″N 17°45′40″E
- Country: Poland
- Voivodeship: Kuyavian-Pomeranian
- County: Żnin
- Gmina: Rogowo
- Population: 8

Jeziora [jɛˈʑɔra] is a village in the administrative district of Gmina Rogowo, within Żnin County, Kuyavian-Pomeranian Voivodeship, in north-central Poland.
