= Władysławowo, Kuyavian-Pomeranian Voivodeship =

Władysławowo
- Village
- Location within Poland
- Coordinates: 53°1′23″N 17°53′13″E
- Country: Poland
- Voivodeship: Kuyavian-Pomeranian
- County: Żnin
- Gmina: Łabiszyn

Władysławowo [vwadɨswaˈvɔvɔ] is a village in the administrative district of Gmina Łabiszyn, within Żnin County, Kuyavian-Pomeranian Voivodeship, in north-central Poland.
