= Obórznia =

- Village
- Location within Poland
- Coordinates: 52°58′N 17°57′E
- Country: Poland
- Voivodeship: Kuyavian-Pomeranian
- County: Żnin
- Gmina: Łabiszyn

Obórznia [ɔˈbuʐɲa] is a village in the administrative district of Gmina Łabiszyn, within Żnin County, Kuyavian-Pomeranian Voivodeship, in north-central Poland.
