= Dąbrówka Barcińska =

- Village
- Location within Poland
- Coordinates: 52°52′N 18°0′E
- Country: Poland
- Voivodeship: Kuyavian-Pomeranian
- County: Żnin
- Gmina: Barcin
- Time zone: UTC+1 (CET)
  - Summer (DST): UTC+2 (CEST)
- Vehicle registration: CZN

Dąbrówka Barcińska (Polish: [dɔmˈbrufka barˈt͡ɕij̃ska]) is a village in the administrative district of Gmina Barcin, within Żnin County, Kuyavian-Pomeranian Voivodeship, in north-central Poland.

== History ==
During the German occupation of Poland (World War II), Dąbrówka was one of the sites of executions of Poles, carried out by the Germans in 1939 as part of the Intelligenzaktion.
