= Zalesie, Żnin County =

Zalesie
- Village
- Location within Poland
- Coordinates: 52°42′N 17°43′E
- Country: Poland
- Voivodeship: Kuyavian-Pomeranian
- County: Żnin
- Gmina: Rogowo
- Time zone: UTC+1 (CET)
  - Summer (DST): UTC+2 (CEST)
- Vehicle registration: CZN

Zalesie [zaˈlɛɕɛ] is a village in the administrative district of Gmina Rogowo, within Żnin County, Kuyavian-Pomeranian Voivodeship, in central Poland.
