= Pszczółczyn, Kuyavian-Pomeranian Voivodeship =

Pszczółczyn
- Village
- Location within Poland
- Coordinates: 53°0′41″N 17°53′45″E
- Country: Poland
- Voivodeship: Kuyavian-Pomeranian
- County: Żnin
- Gmina: Łabiszyn
- Population: 100

Pszczółczyn [ˈpʂt͡ʂuu̯t͡ʂɨn] is a village in the administrative district of Gmina Łabiszyn, within Żnin County, Kuyavian-Pomeranian Voivodeship, in north-central Poland.
