= Janowiec-Wieś =

- Village
- Location within Poland
- Coordinates: 52°45′18″N 17°30′1″E
- Country: Poland
- Voivodeship: Kuyavian-Pomeranian
- County: Żnin
- Gmina: Janowiec Wielkopolski

Janowiec-Wieś [jaˈnɔvjɛt͡s ˈvjɛɕ] is a village in the administrative district of Gmina Janowiec Wielkopolski, within Żnin County, Kuyavian-Pomeranian Voivodeship, in north-central Poland.
