= Oporowo =

Oporowo may refer to the following places:

- Oporowo, Leszno County in Greater Poland Voivodeship (west-central Poland)
- Oporowo, Szamotuły County in Greater Poland Voivodeship (west-central Poland)
- Oporowo, Kuyavian-Pomeranian Voivodeship (north-central Poland)
