= Jeziora-Gajówka =

- Village
- Location within Poland
- Coordinates: 52°39′35″N 17°46′46″E
- Country: Poland
- Voivodeship: Kuyavian-Pomeranian
- County: Żnin
- Gmina: Rogowo

Jeziora-Gajówka [jɛˈʑɔra ɡaˈjufka] is a village in the administrative district of Gmina Rogowo, within Żnin County, Kuyavian-Pomeranian Voivodeship, in north-central Poland.
