= Jabłowo Pałuckie =

- Village
- Location within Poland
- Coordinates: 52°55′N 17°49′E
- Country: Poland
- Voivodeship: Kuyavian-Pomeranian
- County: Żnin
- Gmina: Łabiszyn

Jabłowo Pałuckie [jaˈbwɔvɔ paˈwut͡skʲɛ] is a village in the administrative district of Gmina Łabiszyn, within Żnin County, Kuyavian-Pomeranian Voivodeship, in north-central Poland.
