= Smogorzewo =

Smogorzewo may refer to the following places:

- Smogorzewo, Greater Poland Voivodeship (west-central Poland)
- Smogorzewo, Żnin County in Kuyavian-Pomeranian Voivodeship (north-central Poland)
- Smogorzewo, Włocławek County in Kuyavian-Pomeranian Voivodeship (central Poland)
