= Krotoszyn (disambiguation) =

Krotoszyn may refer to the following places:

- Krotoszyn in Greater Poland Voivodeship (west-central Poland)
- Krotoszyn, Radziejów County in Kuyavian-Pomeranian Voivodeship (north-central Poland)
- Krotoszyn, Żnin County in Kuyavian-Pomeranian Voivodeship (north-central Poland)
