= Mamlicz =

- Village
- Location within Poland
- Coordinates: 52°54′N 18°0′E
- Country: Poland
- Voivodeship: Kuyavian-Pomeranian
- County: Żnin
- Gmina: Barcin

Mamlicz [ˈmamlʲit͡ʂ] is a village in the administrative district of Gmina Barcin, within Żnin County, Kuyavian-Pomeranian Voivodeship, in north-central Poland.
