= Sarnówko, Kuyavian-Pomeranian Voivodeship =

Sarnówko
- Village
- Location within Poland
- Coordinates: 52°36′57″N 17°42′00″E
- Country: Poland
- Voivodeship: Kuyavian-Pomeranian
- County: Żnin
- Gmina: Rogowo
- Population: 3

Sarnówko [sarˈnufkɔ] is a village in the administrative district of Gmina Rogowo, within Żnin County, Kuyavian-Pomeranian Voivodeship, in north-central Poland.
