= Rogówko =

Rogówko may refer to the following places:

- Rogówko, Toruń County in Kuyavian-Pomeranian Voivodeship (north-central Poland)
- Rogówko, Żnin County in Kuyavian-Pomeranian Voivodeship (north-central Poland)
- Rogówko, Rypin County in Kuyavian-Pomeranian Voivodeship (north-central Poland)
- Rogówko, Warmian-Masurian Voivodeship (north Poland)
