= Aleksandrowo, Żnin County =

Aleksandrowo
- Village
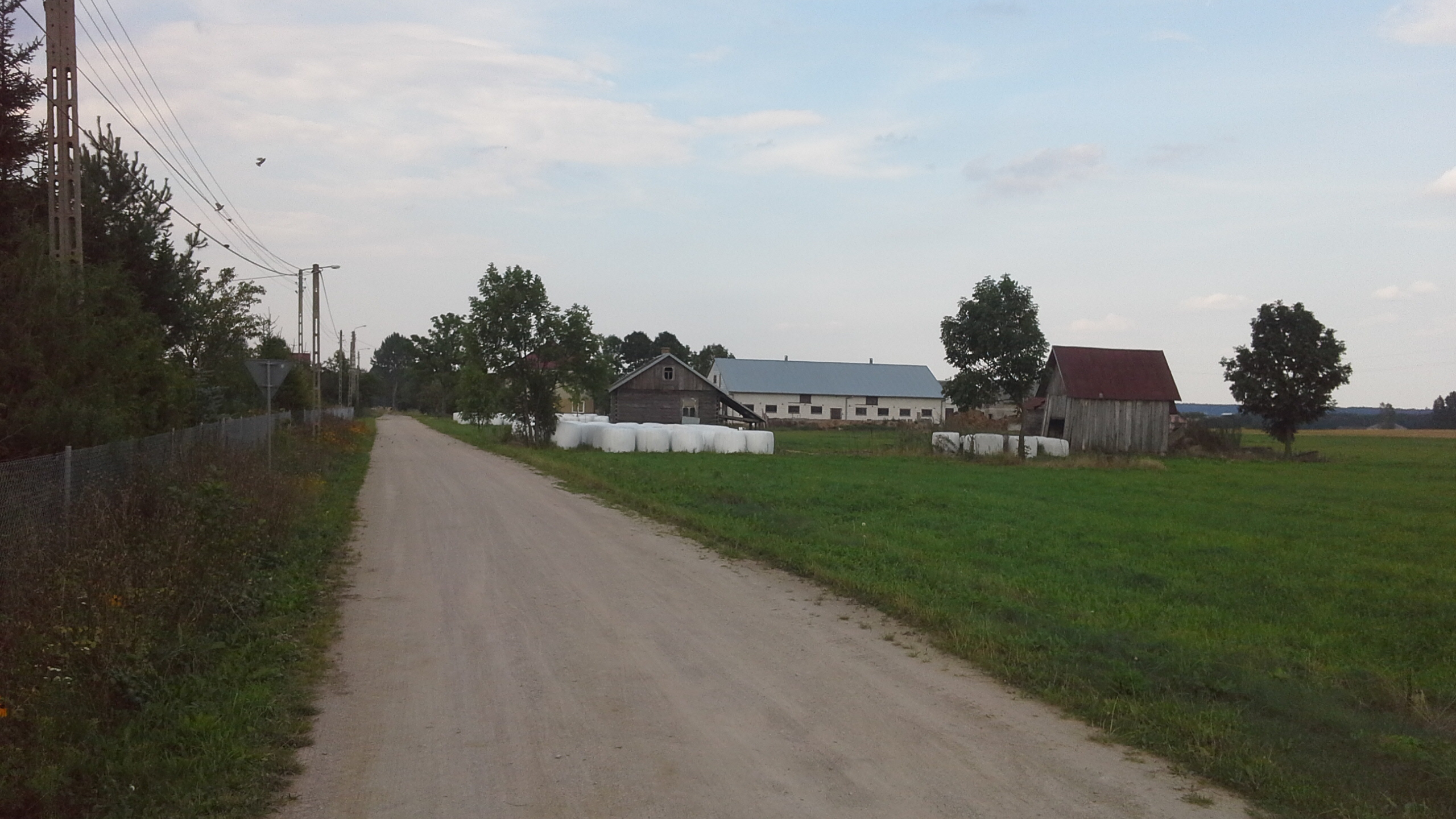

- Location within Poland
- Coordinates: 52°48′53″N 18°2′58″E
- Country: Poland
- Voivodeship: Kuyavian-Pomeranian
- County: Żnin
- Gmina: Barcin
- Time zone: UTC+1 (CET)
  - Summer (DST): UTC+2 (CEST)
- Vehicle registration: CZN

Aleksandrowo [alɛksanˈdrɔvɔ] is a village in the administrative district of Gmina Barcin, within Żnin County, Kuyavian-Pomeranian Voivodeship, in central Poland.
