= Kąpie, Kuyavian-Pomeranian Voivodeship =

Kąpie
- Village
- Location within Poland
- Coordinates: 52°58′01″N 17°54′29″E
- Country: Poland
- Voivodeship: Kuyavian-Pomeranian
- County: Żnin
- Gmina: Łabiszyn

Kąpie [ˈkɔmpjɛ] is a village in the administrative district of Gmina Łabiszyn, within Żnin County, Kuyavian-Pomeranian Voivodeship, in north-central Poland.
