= Recz, Kuyavian-Pomeranian Voivodeship =

Recz
- Village
- Location within Poland
- Coordinates: 52°42′N 17°34′E
- Country: Poland
- Voivodeship: Kuyavian-Pomeranian
- County: Żnin
- Gmina: Rogowo
- Population (approx.): 120

Recz [rɛt͡ʂ] is a village in the administrative district of Gmina Rogowo, within Żnin County, Kuyavian-Pomeranian Voivodeship, in north-central Poland.

The village has an approximate population of 120.
