= Augustowo =

Augustowo (Polish for "Augusta") traditionally referred to the city now known as Augustów.

It may also refer to:

- Augustowo, Bydgoszcz County in Kuyavian-Pomeranian Voivodeship (north-central Poland)
- Augustowo, Żnin County in Kuyavian-Pomeranian Voivodeship (north-central Poland)
- Augustowo, Podlaskie Voivodeship (north-east Poland)
- Augustowo, Mława County in Masovian Voivodeship (east-central Poland)
- Augustowo, Wyszków County in Masovian Voivodeship (east-central Poland)
- Augustowo, Gmina Wielichowo, Grodzisk County in Greater Poland Voivodeship (west-central Poland)
- Augustowo, Leszno County in Greater Poland Voivodeship (west-central Poland)
- Augustowo, Międzychód County in Greater Poland Voivodeship (west-central Poland)
- Augustowo, Złotów County in Greater Poland Voivodeship (west-central Poland)
- Augustowo, Warmian-Masurian Voivodeship (north Poland)

== See also ==
- Augusta (disambiguation)
