= Długi Bród, Kuyavian-Pomeranian Voivodeship =

Długi Bród
- Village
- Location within Poland
- Coordinates: 52°39′3″N 17°41′7″E
- Country: Poland
- Voivodeship: Kuyavian-Pomeranian
- County: Żnin
- Gmina: Rogowo

Długi Bród [ˈdwuɡi ˈbrut] is a village in the administrative district of Gmina Rogowo, within Żnin County, Kuyavian-Pomeranian Voivodeship, in north-central Poland.
