= Dziekszyn =

- Village
- Location within Poland
- Coordinates: 52°45′41″N 17°27′01″E
- Country: Poland
- Voivodeship: Kuyavian-Pomeranian
- County: Żnin
- Gmina: Janowiec Wielkopolski

Dziekszyn [ˈd͡ʑɛkʂɨn] is a village in the administrative district of Gmina Janowiec Wielkopolski, within Żnin County, Kuyavian-Pomeranian Voivodeship, in north-central Poland.
