= Izdebno =

Izdebno may refer to the following places:

- Izdebno, Kuyavian-Pomeranian Voivodeship (north-central Poland)
- Izdebno, Lublin Voivodeship (east Poland)
- Izdebno, Masovian Voivodeship (east-central Poland)
- Izdebno, Międzychód County in Greater Poland Voivodeship (west-central Poland)
- Izdebno, Słupca County in Greater Poland Voivodeship (west-central Poland)
- Izdebno, West Pomeranian Voivodeship (north-west Poland)
