= Ustroń, Kuyavian-Pomeranian Voivodeship =

Ustroń
- Village
- Location within Poland
- Coordinates: 52°43′11″N 17°40′41″E
- Country: Poland
- Voivodeship: Kuyavian-Pomeranian
- County: Żnin
- Gmina: Rogowo

Population
  - Total: 17
- Postal code: 88-420

Ustroń [ˈustrɔɲ] is a village in the administrative district of Gmina Rogowo, within Żnin County, Kuyavian-Pomeranian Voivodeship, in central Poland.
