= Szkółki =

- Village
- Location within Poland
- Coordinates: 52°45′N 17°37′E
- Country: Poland
- Voivodeship: Kuyavian-Pomeranian
- County: Żnin
- Gmina: Rogowo
- Population: 34

Szkółki [ˈʂkuu̯ki] is a village in the administrative district of Gmina Rogowo, within Żnin County, Kuyavian-Pomeranian Voivodeship, in north-central Poland.
