= Sarbinowo Drugie =

- Village
- Location within Poland
- Coordinates: 52°43′N 17°33′E
- Country: Poland
- Voivodeship: Kuyavian-Pomeranian
- County: Żnin
- Gmina: Janowiec Wielkopolski
- Population (approx.): 700

Sarbinowo Drugie [sarbiˈnɔvɔ ˈdruɡʲɛ] is a village in the administrative district of Gmina Janowiec Wielkopolski, within Żnin County, Kuyavian-Pomeranian Voivodeship, in north-central Poland.

The village has an approximate population of 700.
