= Świątkowo, Kuyavian-Pomeranian Voivodeship =

Świątkowo
- Village
- Location within Poland
- Coordinates: 52°49′N 17°35′E
- Country: Poland
- Voivodeship: Kuyavian-Pomeranian
- County: Żnin
- Gmina: Janowiec Wielkopolski

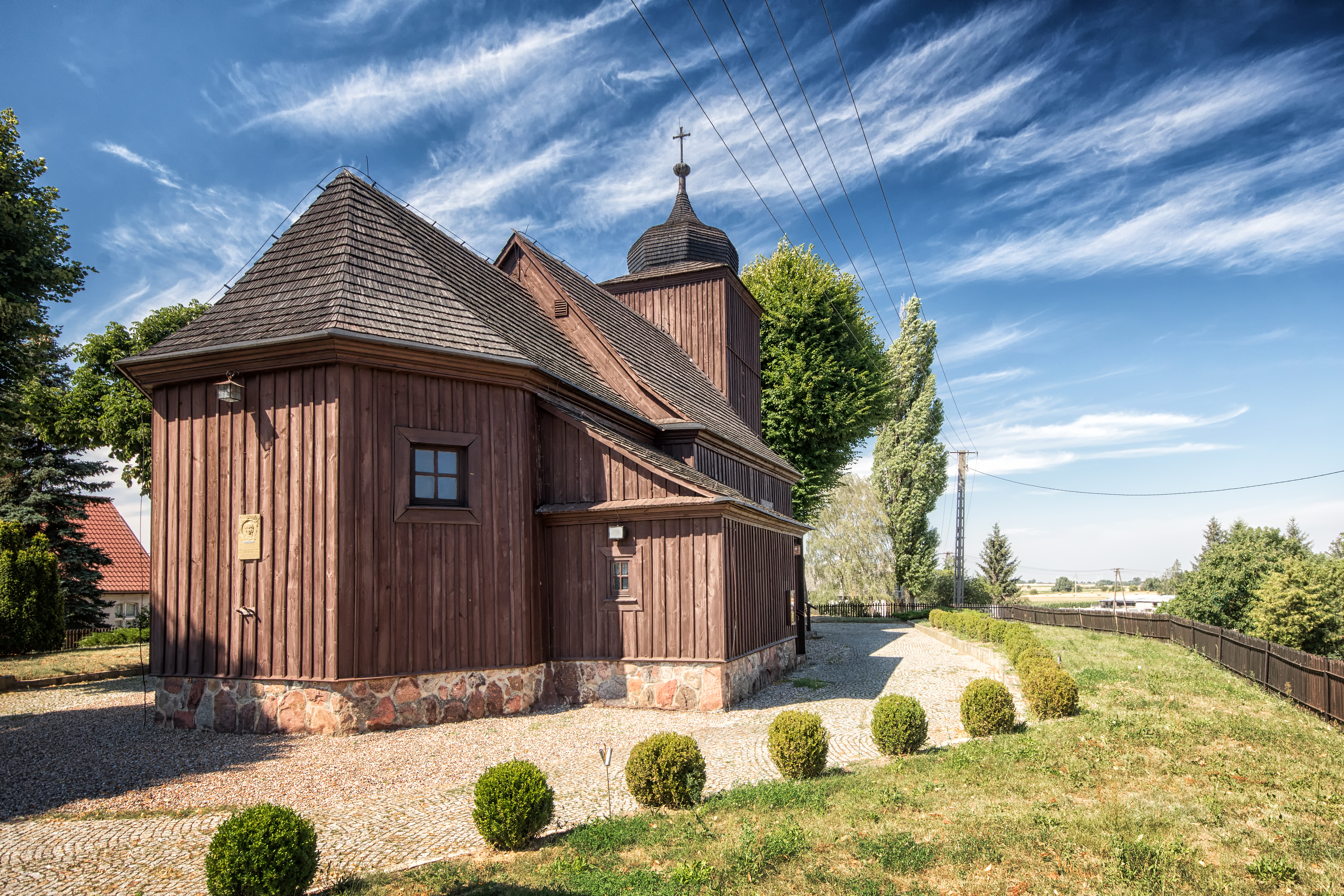
Wooden church of The Holy Trinity from the 18th century.

Świątkowo (Polish: [ɕfjɔntˈkɔvɔ]; German: Goßlerhof) is a village in the administrative district of Gmina Janowiec Wielkopolski, within Żnin County, Kuyavian-Pomeranian Voivodeship, in north-central Poland.
