= Buszkowo =

Buszkowo may refer to the following places:

- Buszkowo, Greater Poland Voivodeship (west-central Poland)
- Buszkowo, Bydgoszcz County in Kuyavian-Pomeranian Voivodeship (north-central Poland)
- Buszkowo, Żnin County in Kuyavian-Pomeranian Voivodeship (north-central Poland)
- Buszkowo, Pomeranian Voivodeship (north Poland)
