= Juncewo, Kuyavian-Pomeranian Voivodeship =

Juncewo
- Village
- Location within Poland
- Coordinates: 52°50′N 17°30′E
- Country: Poland
- Voivodeship: Kuyavian-Pomeranian
- County: Żnin
- Gmina: Janowiec Wielkopolski
- Population: 436

Juncewo [junˈt͡sɛvɔ] is a village in the administrative district of Gmina Janowiec Wielkopolski, within Żnin County, Kuyavian-Pomeranian Voivodeship, in north-central Poland.
