= Wiktorowo, Gmina Rogowo =

Wiktorowo
- Village
- Location within Poland
- Coordinates: 52°42′45″N 17°38′54″E
- Country: Poland
- Voivodeship: Kuyavian-Pomeranian
- County: Żnin
- Gmina: Rogowo

Wiktorowo [viktɔˈrɔvɔ] is a village in the administrative district of Gmina Rogowo, within Żnin County, Kuyavian-Pomeranian Voivodeship, in north-central Poland.
