= Łaziska, Kuyavian-Pomeranian Voivodeship =

Łaziska
- Village
- Location within Poland
- Coordinates: 52°44′13″N 17°39′50″E
- Country: Poland
- Voivodeship: Kuyavian-Pomeranian
- County: Żnin
- Gmina: Rogowo
- Population: 43

Łaziska [waˈʑiska] is a village in the administrative district of Gmina Rogowo, within Żnin County, Kuyavian-Pomeranian Voivodeship, in north-central Poland.
