= Niedźwiady =

Niedźwiady may refer to the following places:

- Niedźwiady, Jarocin County in Greater Poland Voivodeship (west-central Poland)
- Niedźwiady, Nakło County in Kuyavian-Pomeranian Voivodeship (north-central Poland)
- Niedźwiady, Żnin County in Kuyavian-Pomeranian Voivodeship (north-central Poland)
- Niedźwiady, Kalisz County in Greater Poland Voivodeship (west-central Poland)
- Niedźwiady, Konin County in Greater Poland Voivodeship (west-central Poland)
- Niedźwiady, Turek County in Greater Poland Voivodeship (west-central Poland)
- Niedźwiady, Lubusz Voivodeship (west Poland)
- Niedźwiady, Pomeranian Voivodeship (north Poland)
- Niedźwiady, Warmian-Masurian Voivodeship (north Poland)
- Niedźwiady, West Pomeranian Voivodeship (north-west Poland)
