= Gostomka =

- Village
- Location within Poland
- Coordinates: 52°42′29″N 17°40′20″E
- Country: Poland
- Voivodeship: Kuyavian-Pomeranian
- County: Żnin
- Gmina: Rogowo
- Population: 69

Gostomka [ɡɔsˈtɔmka] is a village in the administrative district of Gmina Rogowo, within Żnin County, Kuyavian-Pomeranian Voivodeship, in north-central Poland.
