= Piechcin =

- Village
- Location within Poland
- Coordinates: 52°49′13″N 18°2′23″E
- Country: Poland
- Voivodeship: Kuyavian-Pomeranian
- County: Żnin
- Gmina: Barcin
- Population: 2,987
- Website: http://www.piechcin.pl/

Piechcin [ˈpʲɛxt͡ɕin] is a village in the administrative district of Gmina Barcin, within Żnin County, Kuyavian-Pomeranian Voivodeship, in north-central Poland.

A limestone quarry provides limestone to the LafargeHolcim cement factory, which is also situated there. This quarry has been operational since 1860, and was acquired by the Lafarge Group in 1996.

The village is also known for its another flooded limestone quarry, which is available for diving.

The Parish of Our Lady of Częstochowa and St. Barbara (Polish: Parafia Matki Boskiej Częstochowskiej i świętej Barbary) is situated in Piechcin.
