= Żerniki, Żnin County =

Żerniki
- Village
- Location within Poland
- Coordinates: 52°47′N 17°33′E
- Country: Poland
- Voivodeship: Kuyavian-Pomeranian
- County: Żnin
- Gmina: Janowiec Wielkopolski
- Population: 330

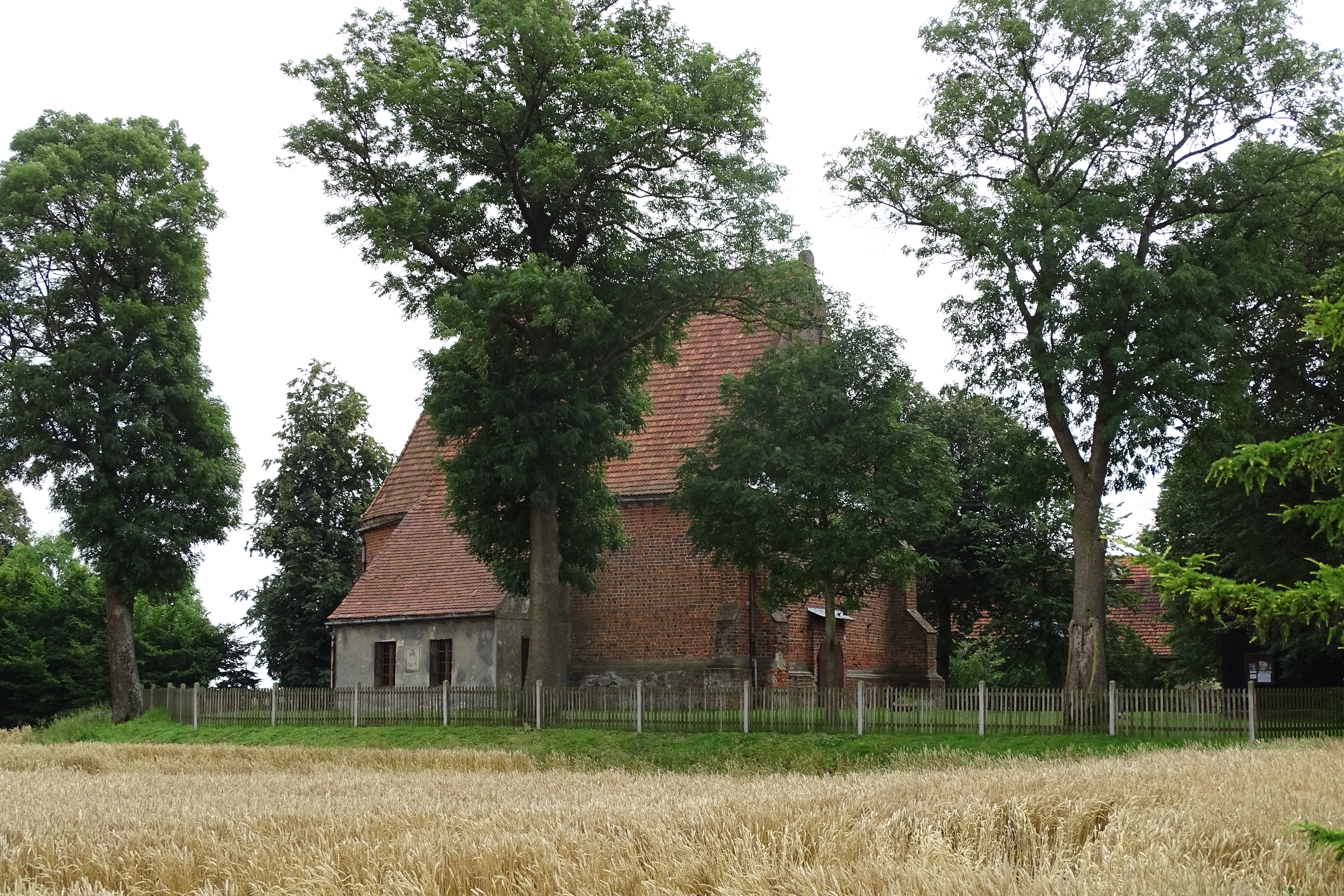
Virgin Mary church from about 1467.

Żerniki (Polish pronunciation: [ʐɛrˈɲikʲi]) is a village in the administrative district of Gmina Janowiec Wielkopolski, within Żnin County, Kuyavian-Pomeranian Voivodeship, in north-central Poland.
