= Jeziora-Leśniczówka =

- Village
- Location within Poland
- Coordinates: 52°39′48″N 17°44′50″E
- Country: Poland
- Voivodeship: Kuyavian-Pomeranian
- County: Żnin
- Gmina: Rogowo

Jeziora-Leśniczówka (Polish pronunciation: [jɛˈʑɔra lɛɕɲiˈtʂufka]) is a village in the administrative district of Gmina Rogowo, within Żnin County, Kuyavian-Pomeranian Voivodeship, in north-central Poland.
