= Rzym =

Rzym is the Polish name for the city of Rome, Italy. It may also refer to the following places in Poland:

- Rzym, Kuyavian-Pomeranian Voivodeship
- Rzym, Pomeranian Voivodeship.
