= Krzysztof Żegocki =

Krzysztof Jan Żegocki (1618 in Rostarzewo – 11 August 1673 in Gościeszyn) was a commander of partisan units which fought with Sweden during 1655–1659. He was also a voivod of Inowrocław (since 1666), bishop of Chełm (since 1670), starosta of Babimost (since 1645) and Konin (since 1660), supporter of Michał Korybut Wiśniowiecki.
