= Klotyldowo =

- Village
- Location within Poland
- Coordinates: 52°56′58″N 17°50′33″E
- Country: Poland
- Voivodeship: Kuyavian-Pomeranian
- County: Żnin
- Gmina: Łabiszyn
- Population: 80

Klotyldowo [klɔtɨlˈdɔvɔ] is a village in the administrative district of Gmina Łabiszyn, within Żnin County, Kuyavian-Pomeranian Voivodeship, in north-central Poland.

== Demographics ==
According to population records published by the Łabiszyn Municipal Office, Klotyldowo had 47 registered residents as of 31 December 2013. By 31 December 2022, the number of permanent registered residents had increased to 50.
