= Zalesie Barcińskie =

- Village
- Location within Poland
- Coordinates: 52°50′22″N 18°01′36″E
- Country: Poland
- Voivodeship: Kuyavian-Pomeranian
- County: Żnin
- Gmina: Barcin
- Population: 99

Zalesie Barcińskie (Polish: [zaˈlɛɕɛ barˈt͡ɕij̃skʲɛ]) is a village in the administrative district of Gmina Barcin, within Żnin County, Kuyavian-Pomeranian Voivodeship, in north-central Poland.
