= Wola (disambiguation) =

Wola is a western district of Warsaw.

Wola or WOLA may also refer to:

== Places ==
=== Poland ===
- Wola, a neighborhood of the district of Jeżyce, Poznań
- Wola, Lipno County, Kuyavian-Pomeranian Voivodeship, a village
- Wola, Żnin County, Kuyavian-Pomeranian Voivodeship, a village
- Wola, Masovian Voivodeship, a village
- Wola, Pomeranian Voivodeship, a village
- Wola, Silesian Voivodeship, a village
- Wola, Subcarpathian Voivodeship, a settlement
- Wola, Bartoszyce County, Warmian-Masurian Voivodeship, a village
- Wola, Iława County, Warmian-Masurian Voivodeship, a village
- Wola, Kętrzyn County, Warmian-Masurian Voivodeship, a village
- Wola, Nidzica County, Warmian-Masurian Voivodeship, a village
- Wola, Węgorzewo County, Warmian-Masurian Voivodeship, a village

=== Mali ===
- Wola, Mali, a town and commune

== Other uses ==
- Wola people, an indigenous group of Papua New Guinea
- Wola (settlement), a type of agricultural settlement in Poland from the 13th century onwards
- Washington Office on Latin America
- WebSphere Optimized Local Adapters
- WOLA (AM), a radio station in Barranquitas, Puerto Rico
- Weighted OverLap-Add Filter bank

== See also ==
- Wola massacre, World War II killing of between 40,000 and 50,000 Poles in the Wola neighbourhood of Warsaw
