= Gołąbki, Kuyavian-Pomeranian Voivodeship =

Gołąbki
- Village
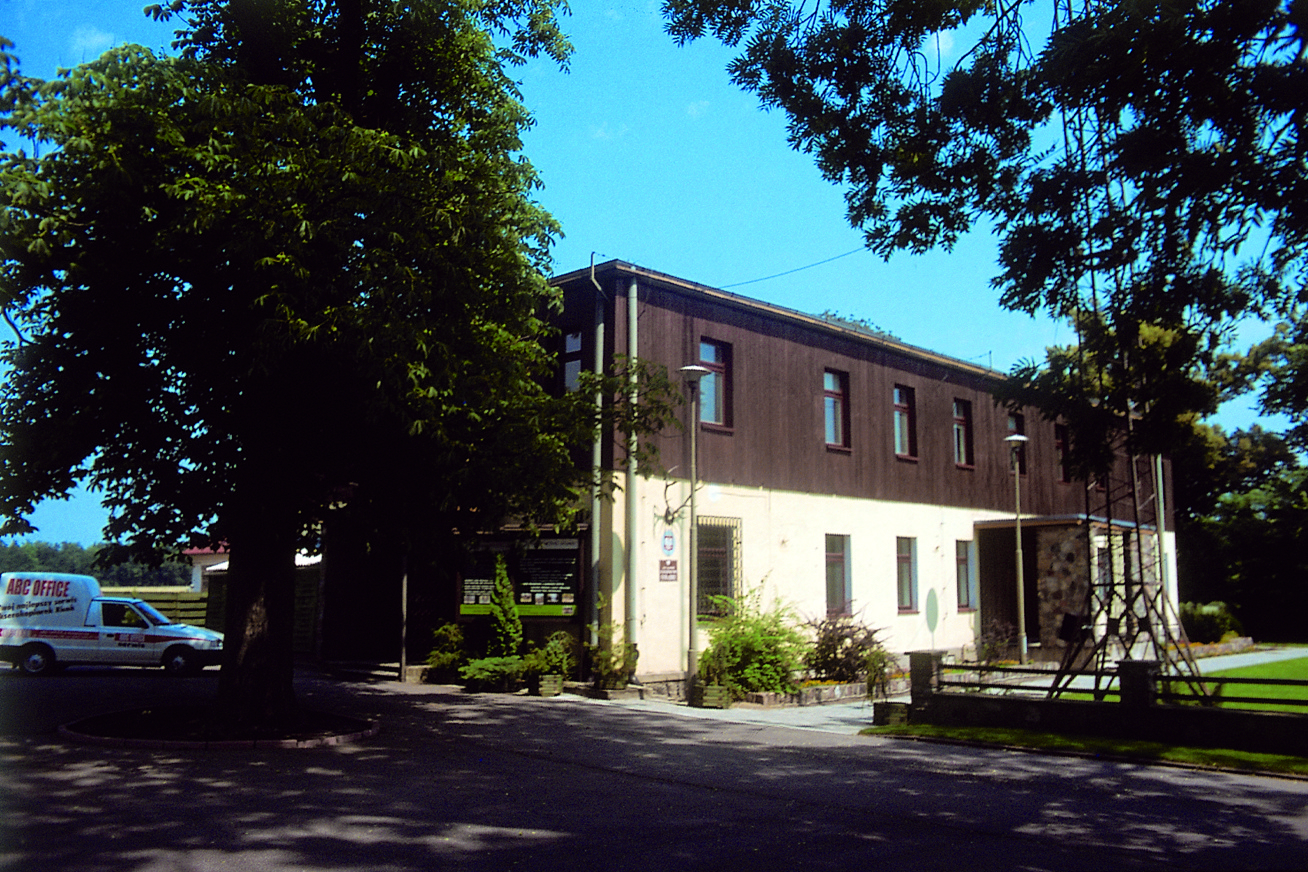
- Gołąbki headquarters of the forest inspectorate

- Location within Poland
- Coordinates: 52°41′34″N 17°46′14″E
- Country: Poland
- Voivodeship: Kuyavian-Pomeranian
- County: Żnin
- Gmina: Rogowo

Gołąbki [ɡɔˈwɔmpki] is a village in the administrative district of Gmina Rogowo, within Żnin County, Kuyavian-Pomeranian Voivodeship, in north-central Poland.
