= Augustowo, Żnin County =

Augustowo
- Village
- Location within Poland
- Coordinates: 52°54′46″N 17°57′6″E
- Country: Poland
- Voivodeship: Kuyavian-Pomeranian
- County: Żnin
- Gmina: Barcin
- Population: 112

Augustowo [auɡusˈtɔvɔ] is a village in the administrative district of Gmina Barcin, within Żnin County, Kuyavian-Pomeranian Voivodeship, in north-central Poland.
