= Wola, Żnin County =

Wola
- Village
- Location within Poland
- Coordinates: 52°47′N 17°39′E
- Country: Poland
- Voivodeship: Kuyavian-Pomeranian
- County: Żnin
- Gmina: Rogowo

Wola [ˈvɔla] is a village in the administrative district of Gmina Rogowo, within Żnin County, Kuyavian-Pomeranian Voivodeship, in north-central Poland.
