= Krotoszyn, Żnin County =

Krotoszyn
- Village
- Location within Poland
- Coordinates: 52°50′49″N 17°57′16″E
- Country: Poland
- Voivodeship: Kuyavian-Pomeranian
- County: Żnin
- Gmina: Barcin
- Population: 527

Krotoszyn [krɔˈtɔʂɨn] is a village in the administrative district of Gmina Barcin, within Żnin County, Kuyavian-Pomeranian Voivodeship, in north-central Poland.
