= Izdebno, Kuyavian-Pomeranian Voivodeship =

Izdebno
- Village
- Location within Poland
- Coordinates: 52°45′16″N 17°38′29″E
- Country: Poland
- Voivodeship: Kuyavian-Pomeranian
- County: Żnin
- Gmina: Rogowo

Izdebno [izˈdɛbnɔ] is a village in the administrative district of Gmina Rogowo, within Żnin County, Kuyavian-Pomeranian Voivodeship, in north-central Poland.
