= Rzym, Kuyavian-Pomeranian Voivodeship =

Rzym
- Village
- Location within Poland
- Coordinates: 52°42′45″N 17°36′41″E
- Country: Poland
- Voivodeship: Kuyavian-Pomeranian
- County: Żnin
- Gmina: Rogowo
- Population: 90

Rzym (Polish pronunciation: [ʐɨm]) is a village in the administrative district of Gmina Rogowo, within Żnin County, Kuyavian-Pomeranian Voivodeship, in north-central Poland.

Rzym is the Polish name for Rome, Italy. The village of Wenecja ("Venice") is located nearby.
