= Janowiec Wielkopolski =

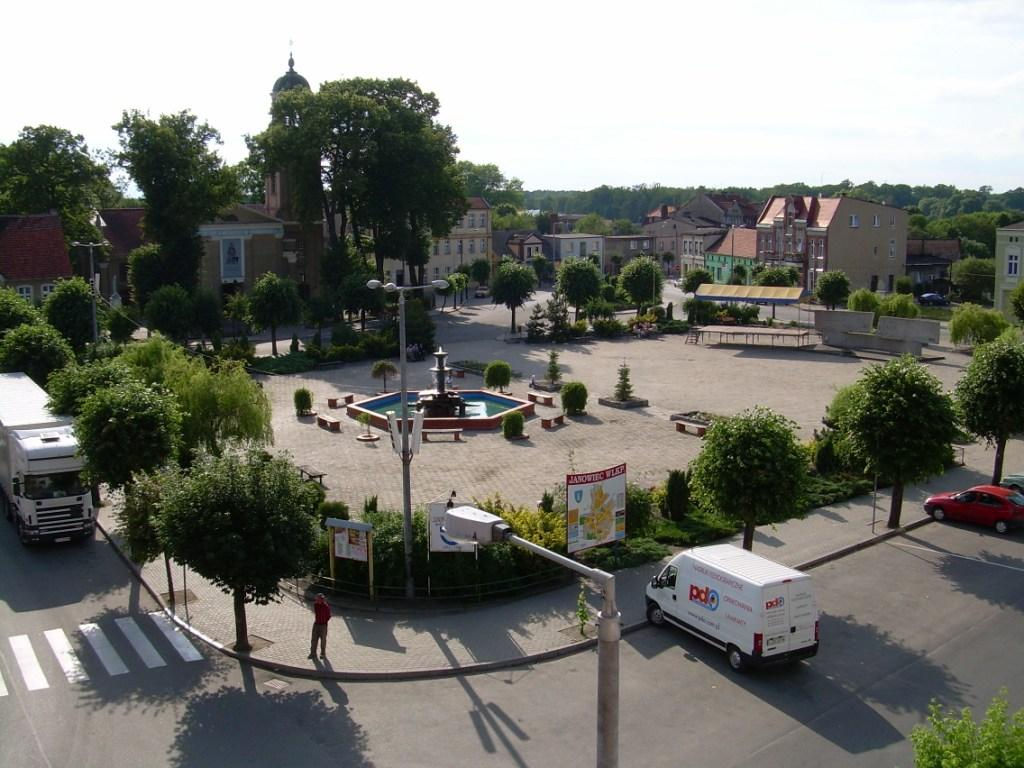
- Town square

- Flag Coat of arms

- Location within Poland
- Coordinates: 52°45′25″N 17°29′17″E
- Country: Poland
- Voivodeship: Kuyavian-Pomeranian
- County: Żnin
- Gmina: Janowiec Wielkopolski

Area
  - Total: 3.04 km^{2} (1.17 sq mi)

Population (2006)
  - Total: 4,114
  - Density: 1,350/km^{2} (3,510/sq mi)
- Postal code: 88-430
- Website: http://www.um-janowiecwlkp.pl/

Janowiec Wielkopolski [jaˈnɔvʲɛt͡s vʲɛlkɔˈpɔlskʲi] is a town in Poland, with 4,357 inhabitants (2005). It is in the Kuyavian-Pomeranian Voivodeship (Kujawsko-Pomorskie, previously Bydgoszcz Voivodeship) and in the Żnin County (Powiat Żniński). The town is situated in the historic land of Pałuki and the Gniezno Lake Area on the river Wełna. Janowiec is exactly halfway between Poznań and Bydgoszcz. The city is surrounded by lakes, agricultural areas and forests, which makes Janowiec an attractive place for holidays. The town is near Gniezno, Biskupin and Rogowo.
