= Buszkowo, Żnin County =

Buszkowo
- Village
- Location within Poland
- Coordinates: 52°54′12″N 17°49′9″E
- Country: Poland
- Voivodeship: Kuyavian-Pomeranian
- County: Żnin
- Gmina: Łabiszyn

Buszkowo [buʂˈkɔvɔ] is a village in the administrative district of Gmina Łabiszyn, within Żnin County, Kuyavian-Pomeranian Voivodeship, in north-central Poland.
