= Niedźwiady, Żnin County =

Niedźwiady
- Village
- Location within Poland
- Coordinates: 52°43′55″N 17°35′20″E
- Country: Poland
- Voivodeship: Kuyavian-Pomeranian
- County: Żnin
- Gmina: Rogowo

Niedźwiady [ɲɛd͡ʑˈvjadɨ] is a village in the administrative district of Gmina Rogowo, within Żnin County, Kuyavian-Pomeranian Voivodeship, in north-central Poland.
