= Gmina Łabiszyn =

Gmina Łabiszyn Łabiszyn Commune
- Gmina
- Flag Coat of arms
- Interactive map of Gmina Łabiszyn
- Coordinates (Łabiszyn): 52°57′11″N 17°54′52″E
- Country: Poland
- Voivodeship: Kuyavian-Pomeranian
- County: Żnin
- Seat: Łabiszyn

Area
  - Total: 166.92 km^{2} (64.45 sq mi)

Population (2006)
  - Total: 9,435
  - Density: 56.52/km^{2} (146.4/sq mi)
  - Urban: 4,473
  - Rural: 4,962
- Website: http://www.labiszyn.pl

Gmina Łabiszyn is an urban-rural gmina (administrative district) in Żnin County, Kuyavian-Pomeranian Voivodeship, in north-central Poland. Its seat is the town of Łabiszyn, which lies approximately 19 kilometres (12 mi) north-east of Żnin and 20 km (12 mi) south of Bydgoszcz.

The gmina covers an area of 166.92 square kilometres (64.4 sq mi), and as of 2006 its total population is 9,435 (out of which the population of Łabiszyn amounts to 4,473, and the population of the rural part of the gmina is 4,962).

== Villages ==
Apart from the town of Łabiszyn, Gmina Łabiszyn contains the villages and settlements of Annowo, Antoniewo, Buszkowo, Jabłówko, Jabłowo Pałuckie, Jeżewice, Jeżewo, Kąpie, Klotyldowo, Łabiszyn-Wieś, Lubostroń, Nowe Dąbie, Obielewo, Obórznia, Ojrzanowo, Oporówek, Oporowo, Ostatkowo, Pszczółczyn, Rzywno, Smerzyn, Smogorzewo, Wielki Sosnowiec, Władysławowo, Wyręba, Załachowo and Zdziersk.

== Neighbouring gminas ==
Gmina Łabiszyn is bordered by the gminas of Barcin, Białe Błota, Nowa Wieś Wielka, Szubin, Złotniki Kujawskie and Żnin.
