= Barcin =

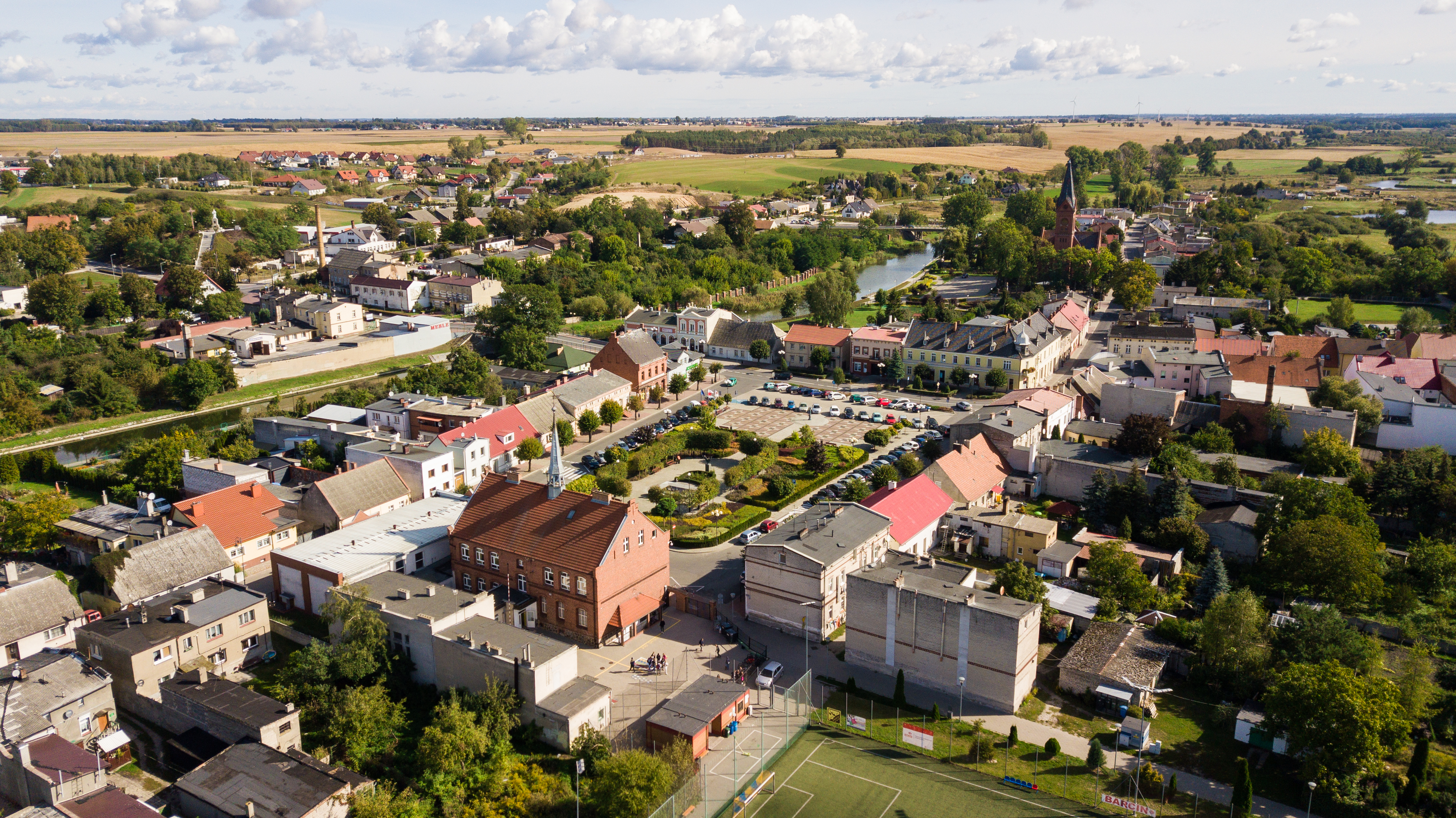
- Aerial view of the town centre

- Flag Coat of arms

- Location within Poland
- Coordinates: 52°51′N 17°57′E
- Country: Poland
- Voivodeship: Kuyavian-Pomeranian
- County: Żnin
- Gmina: Barcin
- Established: 12th century

Government
  - Mayor: Michał Pęziak

Area
  - Total: 3.7 km^{2} (1.4 sq mi)
- Elevation: 78 m (256 ft)

Population (31 December 2021)
  - Total: 7,255
  - Density: 1,961/km^{2} (5,080/sq mi)
- Time zone: UTC+1 (CET)
  - Summer (DST): UTC+2 (CEST)
- Postal code: 88-190, 88-193
- Area code: +48 52
- Vehicle registration: CZN
- Website: http://www.barcin.pl

Barcin [ˈbart͡ɕin] is a town in central Poland, in Kuyavian-Pomeranian Voivodeship, in Żnin County. As of December 2021, the town has a population of 7,255.

== History ==
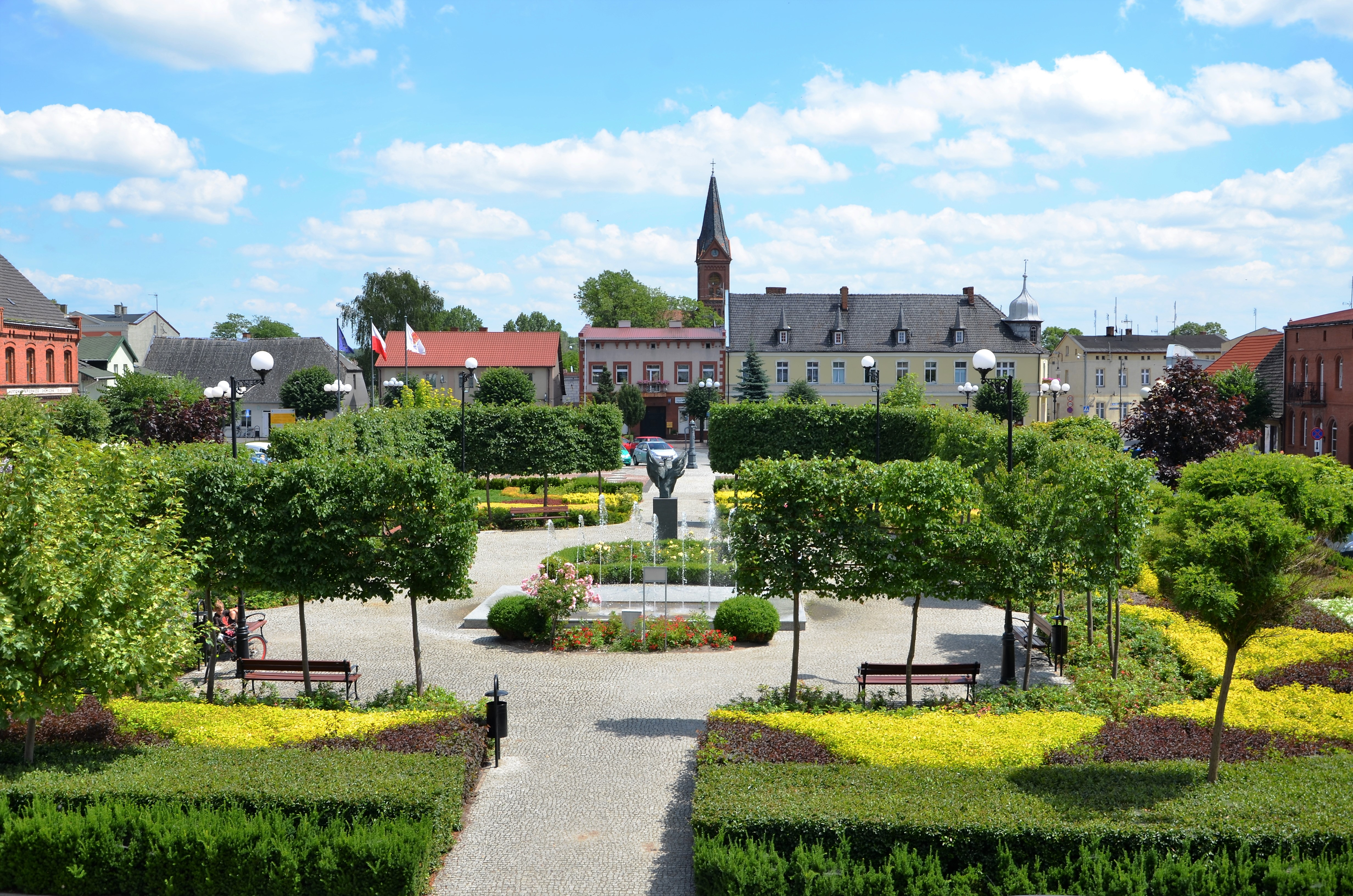
Rynek (Market Square)

Barcin was founded in the 12th century, when it was part of Piast-ruled Poland. In 1472 it was granted privileges, which established local fairs. In the following centuries, it was a private town, administratively located in the Kcynia County in the Kalisz Voivodeship in the Greater Poland Province.

Following the joint German-Soviet invasion of Poland, which started World War II in September 1939, the town was invaded and then occupied by Germany. Barcin was one of the sites of executions of Poles carried out by Germany in 1939 as part of the Intelligenzaktion. Three Poles who were either born or lived in Barcin were also murdered by the Russians in the large Katyn massacre in April–May 1940. In 1943, the Germans renamed the town Bartelstädt to erase traces of Polish origin, however the historic name was restored after the German occupation ended in 1945.

== Demographics ==
Historical population

Year	Pop.	±%
1910	1,586	—
1921	1,628	+2.6%
1931	2,098	+28.9%
1939	2,394	+14.1%

Year	Pop.	±%
1950	1,955	−18.3%
1960	2,504	+28.1%
2010	7,702	+207.6%

== Transport ==
Barcin lies on the intersection of voivodeship roads 254 and 251.

The nearest railway station is in Inowrocław.
