= Laskowo, Żnin County =

Laskowo
- Village
- Location within Poland
- Coordinates: 52°41′51″N 17°29′40″E
- Country: Poland
- Voivodeship: Kuyavian-Pomeranian
- County: Żnin
- Gmina: Janowiec Wielkopolski

Laskowo ([lasˈkɔvɔ]; German: Laßkirch) is a village in the administrative district of Gmina Janowiec Wielkopolski, within Żnin County, Kuyavian-Pomeranian Voivodeship, in north-central Poland.
