= Głęboczek, Żnin County =

Głęboczek
- Village
- Location within Poland
- Coordinates: 52°41′17″N 17°46′11″E
- Country: Poland
- Voivodeship: Kuyavian-Pomeranian
- County: Żnin
- Gmina: Rogowo

Głęboczek [ɡwɛmˈbɔt͡ʂɛk] is a village in the administrative district of Gmina Rogowo, within Żnin County, Kuyavian-Pomeranian Voivodeship, in north-central Poland.
