= Gościeszyn, Kuyavian-Pomeranian Voivodeship =

Gościeszyn
- Village
- Location within Poland
- Coordinates: 52°40′N 17°44′E
- Country: Poland
- Voivodeship: Kuyavian-Pomeranian
- County: Żnin
- Gmina: Rogowo

Gościeszyn (Polish pronunciation: [ɡɔɕˈt͡ɕɛʂɨn]) is a village in the administrative district of Gmina Rogowo, within Żnin County, Kuyavian-Pomeranian Voivodeship, in north-central Poland.
