= Smogorzewo, Żnin County =

Smogorzewo
- Village
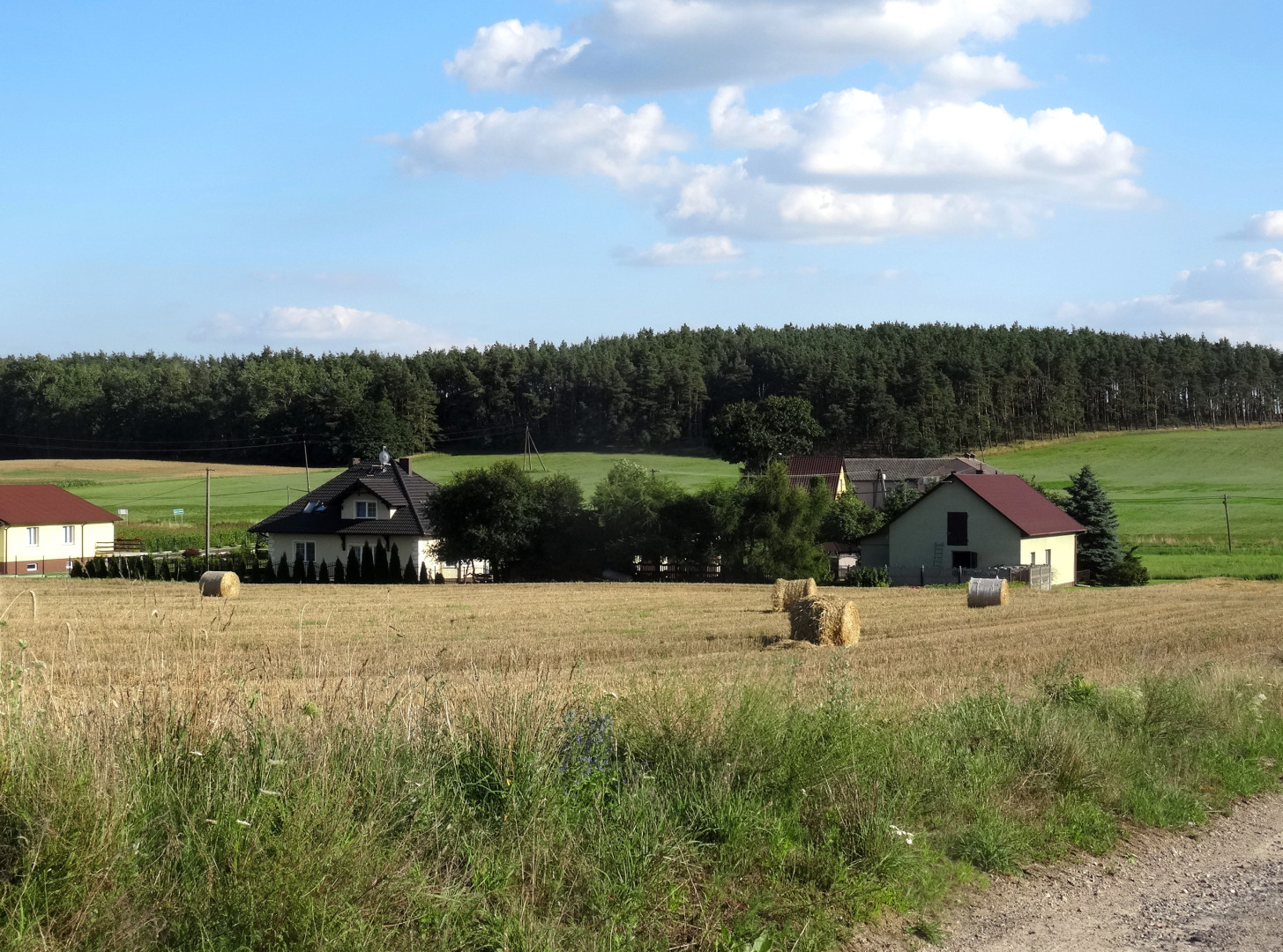

- Location within Poland
- Coordinates: 52°57′27″N 17°57′51″E
- Country: Poland
- Voivodeship: Kuyavian-Pomeranian
- County: Żnin
- Gmina: Łabiszyn
- Population: 150
- Time zone: UTC+1 (CET)
  - Summer (DST): UTC+2 (CEST)
- Vehicle registration: CZN

Smogorzewo [smɔɡɔˈʐɛvɔ] is a village in the administrative district of Gmina Łabiszyn, within Żnin County, Kuyavian-Pomeranian Voivodeship, in north-central Poland.

== History ==
During the German occupation of Poland (World War II), Smogorzewo was one of the sites of executions of Poles, carried out by the Germans in 1939 as part of the Intelligenzaktion.
