= Gmina Barcin =

Gmina Barcin Barcin Commune
- Gmina
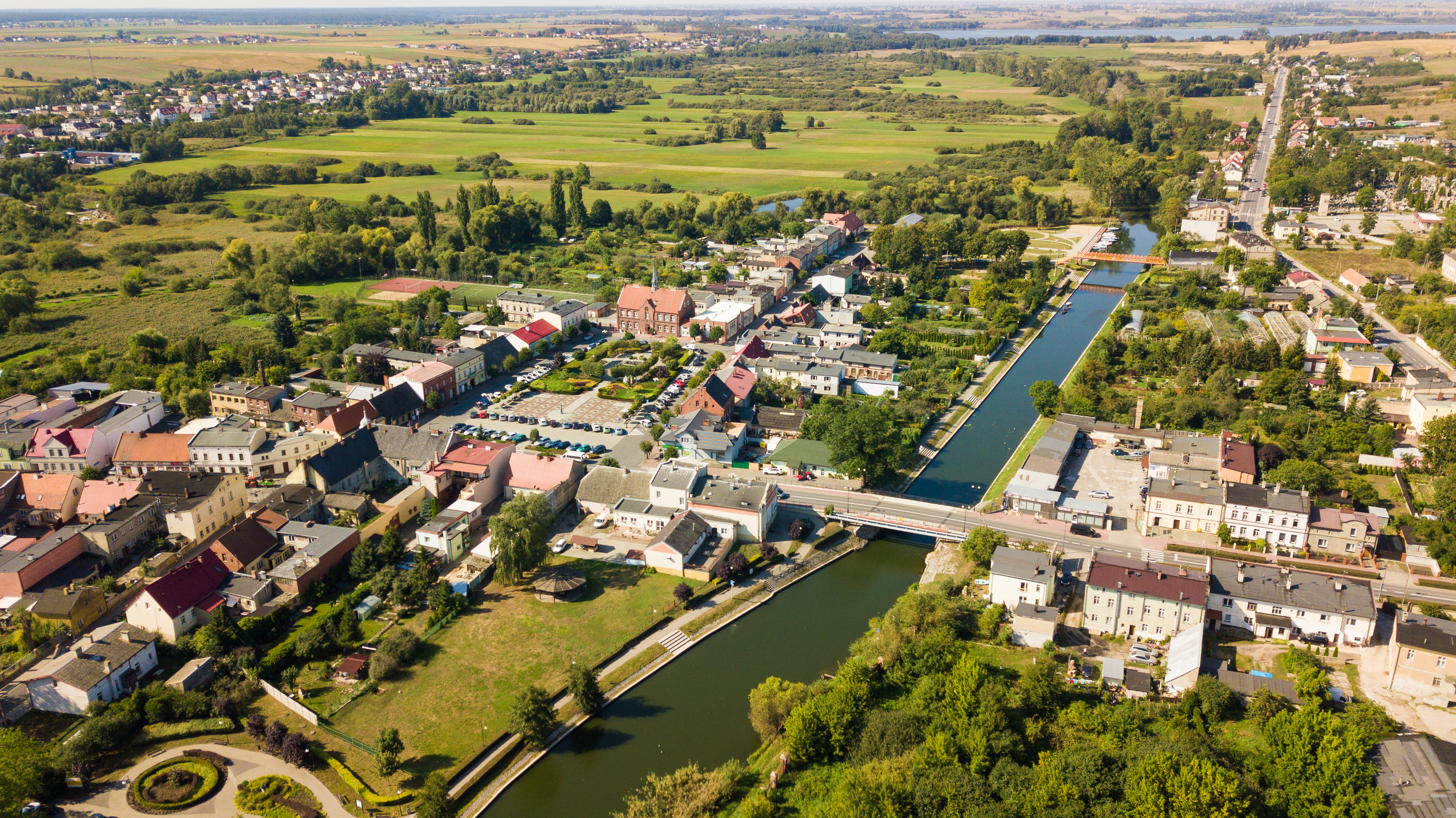
- Barcin - Noteć river

- Flag Coat of arms
- Interactive map of Gmina Barcin
- Coordinates (Barcin): 52°51′N 17°57′E
- Country: Poland
- Voivodeship: Kuyavian-Pomeranian
- County: Żnin
- Seat: Barcin

Area
  - Total: 121.08 km^{2} (46.75 sq mi)

Population (2006)
  - Total: 14,791
  - Density: 122.16/km^{2} (316.39/sq mi)
  - Urban: 7,810
  - Rural: 6,981
- Website: http://www.barcin.pl/

Gmina Barcin is an urban-rural gmina (administrative district) in Żnin County, Kuyavian-Pomeranian Voivodeship, in north-central Poland. Its seat is the town of Barcin, which lies approximately 17 kilometres (11 mi) east of Żnin and 30 km (19 mi) south of Bydgoszcz.

The gmina covers an area of 121.08 square kilometres (46.7 sq mi), and as of 2006 its total population is 14,791, of which the population of Barcin is 7,810, and the population of the rural part of the gmina is 6,981.

== Villages ==
Apart from the town of Barcin, Gmina Barcin contains the villages and settlements of Aleksandrowo, Augustowo, Barcin-Wieś, Bielawy, Dąbrówka Barcińska, Gulczewo, Józefinka, Julianowo, Kania, Knieja, Krotoszyn, Mamlicz, Młodocin, Piechcin, Pturek, Sadłogoszcz, Szeroki Kamień, Wapienno, Wolice, Zalesie Barcińskie and Złotowo.

== Neighbouring gminas ==
Gmina Barcin is bordered by the gminas of Dąbrowa, Łabiszyn, Pakość, Złotniki Kujawskie and Żnin.
