= Gmina Janowiec Wielkopolski =

Gmina Janowiec Wielkopolski Janowiec Wielkopolski Commune
- Gmina
- Coat of arms
- Interactive map of Gmina Janowiec Wielkopolski
- Coordinates (Janowiec Wielkopolski): 52°45′25″N 17°29′17″E
- Country: Poland
- Voivodeship: Kuyavian-Pomeranian
- County: Żnin
- Seat: Janowiec Wielkopolski

Area
  - Total: 130.74 km^{2} (50.48 sq mi)

Population (2006)
  - Total: 9,314
  - Density: 71.24/km^{2} (184.5/sq mi)
  - Urban: 4,114
  - Rural: 5,200

Gmina Janowiec Wielkopolski is an urban-rural gmina (administrative district) in Żnin County, Kuyavian-Pomeranian Voivodeship, in north-central Poland. Its seat is the town of Janowiec Wielkopolski, which lies approximately 18 kilometres (11 mi) south-west of Żnin and 53 km (33 mi) south-west of Bydgoszcz.

The gmina covers an area of 130.74 square kilometres (50.5 sq mi), and as of 2006 its total population is 9,314 (out of which the population of Janowiec Wielkopolski amounts to 4,114, and the population of the rural part of the gmina is 5,200).

== Villages ==
Apart from the town of Janowiec Wielkopolski, Gmina Janowiec Wielkopolski contains the villages and settlements of Bielawy, Brudzyń, Brudzyń-Leśniczówka, Chrzanowo, Dębiec, Dziekszyn, Flantrowo, Gącz, Janowiec-Wieś, Juncewo, Kołdrąb, Łapaj, Laskowo, Miniszewo, Obiecanowo, Ośno, Posługowo, Puzdrowiec, Sarbinowo Drugie, Świątkowo, Tonowo, Wełna, Włoszanowo, Wybranowo, Żerniki, Zrazim and Żużoły.

== Neighbouring gminas ==
Gmina Janowiec Wielkopolski is bordered by the gminas of Damasławek, Mieleszyn, Mieścisko, Rogowo and Żnin.
