= Gmina Rogowo, Żnin County =

Gmina Rogowo Rogowo Commune
- Gmina
- Flag Coat of arms
- Interactive map of Gmina Rogowo
- Coordinates (Rogowo): 52°44′N 17°40′E
- Country: Poland
- Voivodeship: Kuyavian-Pomeranian
- County: Żnin
- Seat: Rogowo

Area
  - Total: 178.56 km^{2} (68.94 sq mi)

Population (2006)
  - Total: 6,899
  - Density: 38.64/km^{2} (100.1/sq mi)
- Website: www.rogowo.paluki.pl

Gmina Rogowo is a rural gmina (administrative district) in Żnin County, Kuyavian-Pomeranian Voivodeship, in north-central Poland. Its seat is the village of Rogowo, which lies approximately 14 kilometres (9 mi) south of Żnin and 49 km (30 mi) south-west of Bydgoszcz.

The gmina covers an area of 178.56 square kilometres (68.9 sq mi), and as of 2006 its total population is 6,899.

== Villages ==
Gmina Rogowo contains the villages and settlements of Bielawka, Biskupiec, Bożacin, Budzisław, Cegielnia, Cotoń, Czewujewo, Długi Bród, Gałęzewko, Gałęzewo, Głęboczek, Gołąbki, Gościeszyn, Gościeszynek, Gostomka, Grochowiska Księże, Grochowiska Szlacheckie, Izdebno, Jeziora, Jeziora-Gajówka, Jeziora-Leśniczówka, Kępniak, Łaziska, Lubcz, Lubczynek, Mięcierzyn, Mięcierzyn-Leśniczówka, Niedźwiady, Recz, Rogówko, Rogowo, Rudunek, Ryszewo, Rzym, Sarnówko, Skórki, Szkółki, Ustroń, Wiewiórczyn, Wiktorowo, Wola, Zalesie and Złotniki.

== Neighbouring gminas ==
Gmina Rogowo is bordered by the gminas of Gąsawa, Gniezno, Janowiec Wielkopolski, Mieleszyn, Mogilno, Trzemeszno and Żnin.
