= Grochowiska Szlacheckie =

- Village
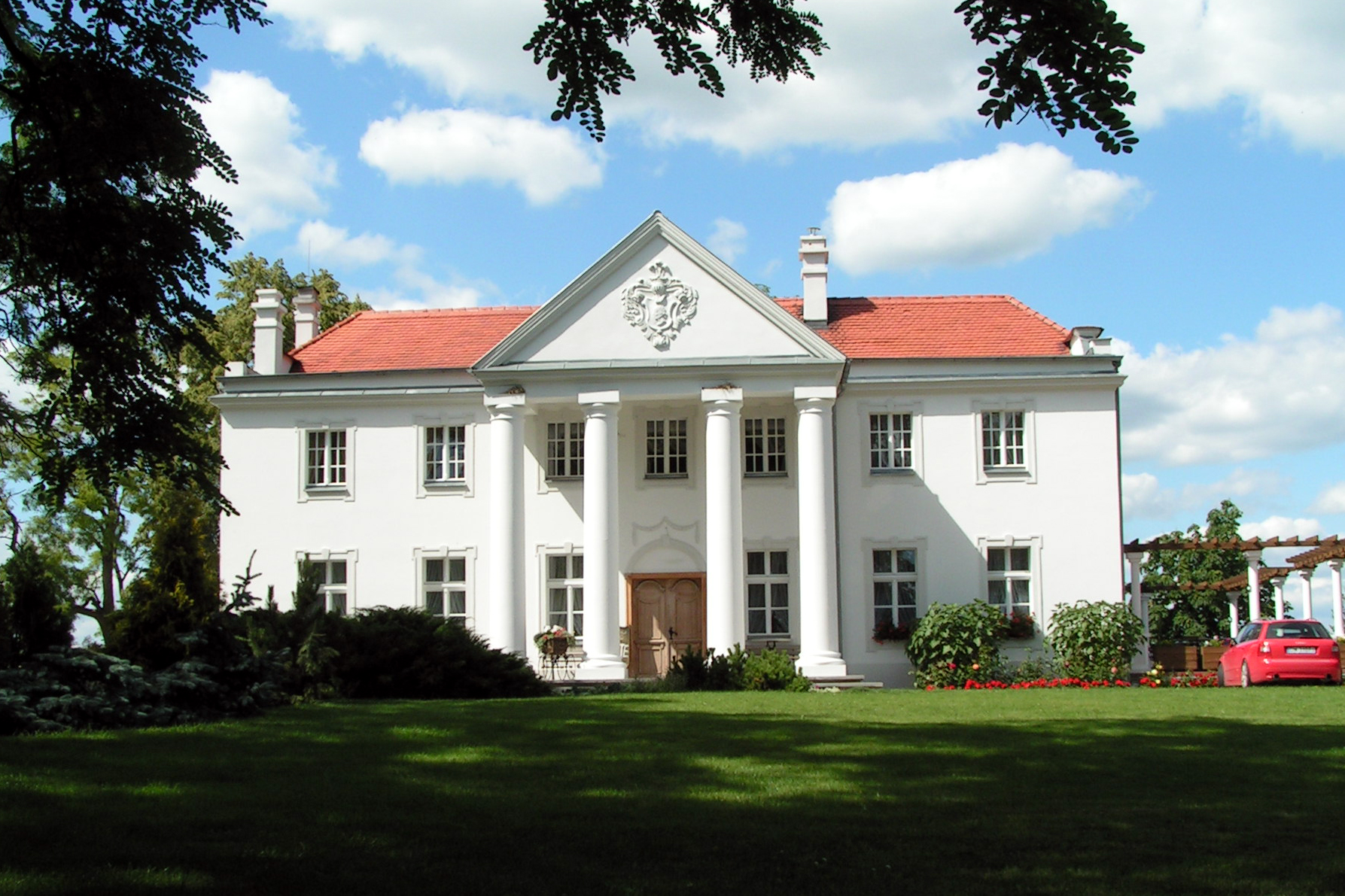
- Palace

- Location within Poland
- Coordinates: 52°44′07″N 17°41′40″E
- Country: Poland
- Voivodeship: Kuyavian-Pomeranian
- County: Żnin
- Gmina: Rogowo

Grochowiska Szlacheckie [ɡrɔxɔˈviska ʂlaˈxɛt͡skʲɛ] is a village in the administrative district of Gmina Rogowo, within Żnin County, Kuyavian-Pomeranian Voivodeship, in north-central Poland.
