= Annowo, Gmina Łabiszyn =

Annowo
- Village
- Location within Poland
- Coordinates: 53°1′35″N 17°51′51″E
- Country: Poland
- Voivodeship: Kuyavian-Pomeranian
- County: Żnin
- Gmina: Łabiszyn
- Population: 110

Annowo [anˈnɔvɔ] is a village in the administrative district of Gmina Łabiszyn, within Żnin County, Kuyavian-Pomeranian Voivodeship, in north-central Poland.
