= Rogowo =

- Village
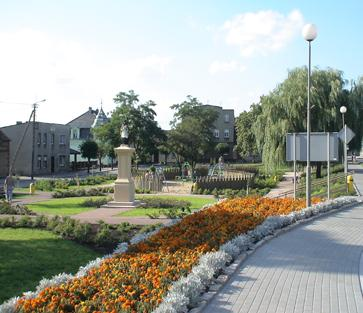
- Park

- Flag Coat of arms

- Location within Poland
- Coordinates: 52°43′35″N 17°39′4″E
- Country: Poland
- Voivodeship: Kuyavian-Pomeranian
- County: Żnin
- Gmina: Rogowo
- Established: 1311
- City rights: 1380
- Population (approx.): 2,000
- Website: http://www.rogowo.org

Rogowo [rɔˈɡɔvɔ] is a village (formerly a town) in Żnin County, Kuyavian-Pomeranian Voivodeship, in north-central Poland. It is the seat of the gmina (administrative district) called Gmina Rogowo. The village has an approximate population of 2,000. Its history can be traced back to 1311, but it was in 1380 when Rogowo received town rights. These rights were lost on March 23, 1933.

Rogowo is home to the field hockey team Ludowy Klub Sportowy (LKS) Rogowo. Many of its players played in the Polish National team in many international events.

Rogowo is surrounded by many lakes, which offer great attractions mostly to fisherman and campers. The biggest attraction is the newly established Dinosaur Theme Park, Zaurolandia, which opened in April 2007.

== Church of Saint Dorothy ==
Church of Saint Dorothy is a Roman Catholic church situated approximately 700 meters from city center. Building was finished in year 1831, and was consecrated in year 1906. Construction was led by Józef Korytowski. On March 30, 2014, roof and pipe organs of the church got burned in a fire. Nothing inside has been burned, but water used to extinguish the fire, damaged some of church's equipment. As of Today, nobody knows why church caught on fire.
