= Żnin County =

Żnin County Powiat żniński
- County
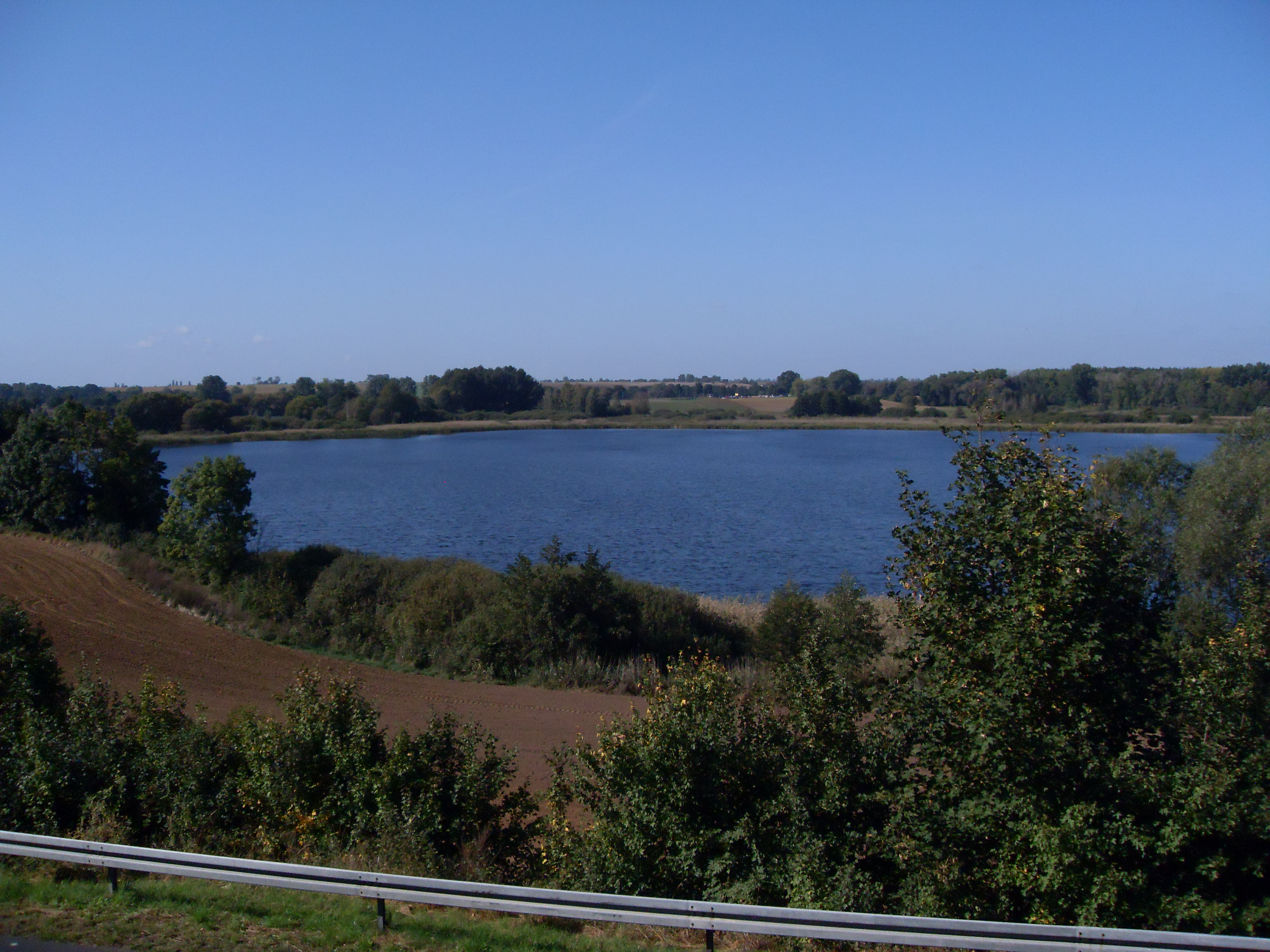

- Flag Coat of arms

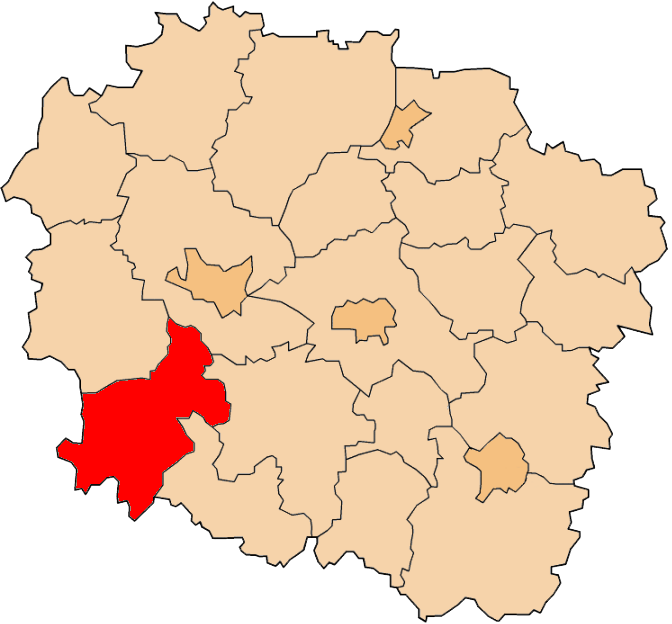
- Location within the voivodeship
- Coordinates (Żnin): 52°51′N 17°42′E
- Country: Poland
- Voivodeship: Kuyavian-Pomeranian
- Seat: Żnin
- Gminas: Total 6: Gmina Barcin; Gmina Gąsawa; Gmina Janowiec Wielkopolski; Gmina Łabiszyn; Gmina Rogowo; Gmina Żnin

Area
  - Total: 984.55 km^{2} (380.14 sq mi)

Population (2019)
  - Total: 68,113
  - Density: 69.182/km^{2} (179.18/sq mi)
  - Urban: 29,697
  - Rural: 38,416
- Car plates: CZN
- Website: www.znin.pl

Żnin County (Polish: powiat żniński) is a unit of territorial administration and local government (powiat) in Kuyavian-Pomeranian Voivodeship, north-central Poland. It came into being on January 1, 1999, as a result of the Polish local government reforms passed in 1998. Its administrative seat and largest town is Żnin, which lies 36 km (22 mi) south-west of Bydgoszcz and 65 km (40 mi) west of Toruń. The county contains three other towns: Barcin, lying 17 km (11 mi) east of Żnin, Łabiszyn, lying 19 km (12 mi) north-east of Żnin, and Janowiec Wielkopolski, 18 km (11 mi) south-west of Żnin.

The county covers an area of 984.55 square kilometres (380.1 sq mi). As of 2019 its total population is 68,113, out of which the population of Żnin is 13,864, that of Barcin is 7,408, that of Łabiszyn is 4,472, that of Janowiec Wielkopolski is 3,953, and the rural population is 38,416.

== Neighbouring counties ==
Żnin County is bordered by Nakło County to the north, Bydgoszcz County to the north-east, Inowrocław County to the east, Mogilno County to the south-east, Gniezno County to the south and Wągrowiec County to the west.

== Administrative divisions ==
The county is subdivided into six gminas (four urban-rural and two rural). These are listed in the following table, in descending order of population.

Gmina	Type	Area (km^{2})	Population (2019)	Seat
Gmina Żnin	Urban-rural	251.6	24,123	Żnin
Gmina Barcin	Urban-rural	121.1	14,788	Barcin
Gmina Gąsawa	Urban-rural	135.7	5,283	Gąsawa
Gmina Łabiszyn	Urban-rural	166.9	10,158	Łabiszyn
Gmina Janowiec Wielkopolski	Urban-rural	130.7	9,032	Janowiec Wielkopolski
Gmina Rogowo	Rural	178.6	4,729	Rogowo
