= Józef Rogacki =

Polish politician (born 1953)

1st Governor of Kuyavian-Pomeranian Voivodeship
- In office 1999-01-01 – 2001-10-20
- Succeeded by: Romuald Kosieniak

Member of Greater Poland Regional Assembly
- In office 1998–1998

Member of Kuyavian-Pomeranian Regional Assembly
- Incumbent
- Assumed office 2006
- Constituency: 1 (Bydgoszcz City)

Vice-President (Vice-Mayor) of Kalisz
- In office 1990–1998

Personal details
- Born: November 21, 1953 (age 72)
- Party: Solidarity Electoral Action; Law and Justice
- Spouse: Elżbieta

Józef Rogacki (born 21 November 1953, in Gorzałów) is a Polish politician who is a current Member of Kuyavian-Pomeranian Regional Assembly.

== Biography ==
=== Kalisz career ===
Between 1990 and 1998 he was a Member of the Kalisz City Council. Between 1990 and 1994 he was a Vice-President (= Vice-Mayor) of Kalisz also. Until 1998 he was a member of city executive board (Polish: Zarząd Miasta Kalisza). In 1998 he was a last Governor of Kalisz Voivodeship (wojewoda kaliski) in Cabinet of Jerzy Buzek.

=== Kuyavian-Pomeranian Career ===
In 1998 local election he joined the Greater Poland Regional Assembly I term, but he resign after his nominations as 1st Governor of Kuyavian-Pomeranian Voivodeship (wojewoda kujawsko-pomorski) in Cabinet of Jerzy Buzek. In 2001 new Prime Minister nominated new governor.

In 2006 local election he joined the Kuyavian-Pomeranian Regional Assembly III term representing the 1st district. He scored 4,972 votes, running on the Law and Justice list.

He is a president of Forest Park of Culture and Leisure "Myślęcinek" (Leśny Parku Kultury i Wypoczynku „Myślęcinek”, LPKiW), municipal limited liability company.

== Personal life ==
Józef Rogacki and his wife, Elżbieta, have one son, Adam and three grandchildren.

== See also ==
- Kuyavian-Pomeranian Voivodeship
