= Michał Sztybel =

Polish politician

Voivode of Kuyavian–Pomeranian Voivodeship
- Incumbent
- Assumed office 20 December 2023
- President: Andrzej Duda; Karol Nawrocki
- Prime Minister: Donald Tusk
- Preceded by: Mikołaj Bogdanowicz

Personal details
- Born: 12 August 1985 (age 41) Bydgoszcz, Polish People's Republic
- Citizenship: Poland
- Party: Civic Platform
- Education: Kazimierz Wielki University in Bydgoszcz
- Occupation: Politician
- Awards: Medal of Merit for the Police

Michał Piotr Sztybel (born August 12, 1985, in Bydgoszcz) is a Polish politician and local government official. He served as Vice-Mayor of Bydgoszcz from 2018 to 2023 and as Voivode of Kuyavian–Pomeranian Voivodeship from 2023.

== Biography ==
He was born in Bydgoszcz. He graduated in political science from Casimir the Great University and completed postgraduate studies in accounting at the Wrocław University of Economics. He was associated with the youth wing of the Freedom Union and later joined the Law and Justice party. He served as an assistant to MP Tomasz Markowski and an advisor to Voivode Zbigniew Hoffmann.

In the 2006 elections, he was elected to the Bydgoszcz City Council. He was a member of the Law and Justice party (PiS) until 2009. In the 2010 local elections, he successfully ran for re-election to the city council on behalf of Konstanty Dombrowicz's committee. In 2011, he joined the Civic Platform party. In 2014, he was elected to the city council for the third time from its list.

In 2015, he was appointed advisor to Rafał Bruski, Mayor of Bydgoszcz, and consequently resigned from his council seat. In 2016, he became Director of the Social Communications Office at Bydgoszcz City Hall. In November 2018, he assumed the position of Deputy Mayor, responsible for investments, public procurement, municipal waste management, and European funds. In 2021, he assumed the position of Chairman of the Civic Platform in Bydgoszcz. On December 20, 2023, he was appointed Voivode of Kuyavian–Pomeranian Voivodeship.
