= Romuald Kosieniak =

Polish politician (born 1957)

2nd Voivode of Kuyavian-Pomeranian Voivodeship
- In office 2001-10-20 – 2006-01-26
- Preceded by: Józef Rogacki
- Succeeded by: Józef Ramlau

Vice-Starosta of Bydgoszcz County
- In office 1998–2001

Personal details
- Born: April 20, 1957 (age 68) Bydgoszcz, Poland
- Party: Democratic Left Alliance

Romuald Kosieniak (born 20 April 1957 in Bydgoszcz) is a former Polish politician who was a 2nd Voivode of Kuyavian-Pomeranian Voivodeship (2001-2006) and Vice-Starosta of Bydgoszcz County (1998-2001).

He graduated AGH University of Science and Technology and Nicolaus Copernicus University in Toruń. He worked as geodesist. Since 1987 he worked in Bydgoszcz Voivodeship Office.

Between 1998 and 2001 he was a Vice-Starosta of Bydgoszcz County (Polish: wicestarosta powiatu bydgoskiego).

After appointed of Leszek Miller Cabinet, Kosieniak was nominated as Voivode of Kuyavian-Pomeranian Voivodeship (wojewoda kujawsko-pomorski). He was a Voivode between 20 October 2001 and 26 January 2006.

== See also ==
- Kuyavian-Pomeranian Voivodeship
