= Vistula Landscape Park =

Protected area in Poland

Coordinates: 53.1936°N 18.2186°E

- Nadwiślański Park Krajobrazowy
- IUCN category V (protected landscape/seascape)
- Interactive map of Vistula Landscape Park
- Location: Kuyavian-Pomeranian Voivodeship
- Area: 333.06 km^{2} (128.60 sq mi)
- Established: 1993

Vistula Landscape Park (Nadwiślański Park Krajobrazowy) is a protected area (Landscape Park) in north-central Poland, established in 1993, covering an area of 333.06 square kilometres (128.60 sq mi).

The Park lies within Kuyavian-Pomeranian Voivodeship, on the left bank of the Vistula river north of Bydgoszcz. It forms a complex with Chełmno Landscape Park on the opposite bank. From 1999 to 2003 these constituted a single Landscape Park, called Lower Vistula Valley Landscape Park (Park Krajobrazowy Doliny Dolnej Wisły). The two parks have a common administration located in Świecie.

Within Vistula Landscape Park are 14 nature reserves.
