= Józef Ramlau =

Polish politician

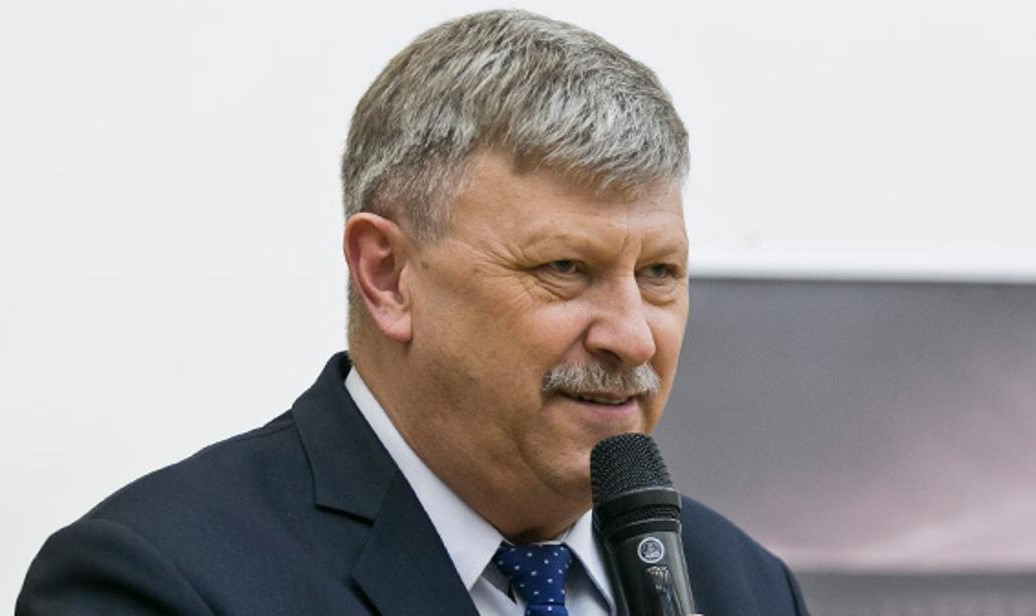

3rd Voivode of Kuyavian-Pomeranian Voivodeship
- In office 2006-01-26 – 2006-07-24
- Preceded by: Romuald Kosieniak
- Succeeded by: Marzenna Drab (acting)

Member of Toruń County Council
- In office 1998–2002

Personal details
- Born: December 17, 1958 (age 67) Chojnice, Poland
- Party: PSL-People's Agreement; Social Movement; Civic Platform; Law and Justice

Józef Jan Ramlau (born 17 December 1958 in Chojnice) is a Polish politician who was a Voivode of Kuyavian-Pomeranian Voivodeship (2006) and a Member of Toruń County Council (1998-2002).

Between 1996 and 2002 he was a Secretary of Toruń City Office. In 1998 local election he joined the Toruń County Council I term.

In 2002 local election he was a candidate for Wójt (= Vogt) of Gmina Obrowo. He was one of two candidate and Ramlau polled 590 votes only (16.62%) New Wójt was Andrzej Wieczyński.

After appointed of Kazimierz Marcinkiewicz Cabinet, Ramlau was nominated as Voivode of Kuyavian-Pomeranian Voivodeship (wojewoda kujawsko-pomorski). He was a Voivode between 26 January 2006 and 24 July 2006.

== See also ==
- Kuyavian-Pomeranian Voivodeship
