= Chełmno Landscape Park =

Protected area in north-central Poland

Coordinates: 53.3723°N 18.4887°E

- Chełmiński Park Krajobrazowy
- IUCN category V (protected landscape/seascape)
- Interactive map of Chełmno Landscape Park
- Location: Kuyavian-Pomeranian Voivodeship
- Area: 223.36 km^{2} (86.24 sq mi)
- Established: 1998

Chełmno Landscape Park (Chełmiński Park Krajobrazowy) is a protected area (Landscape Park) in north-central Poland, established in 1998, covering an area of 223.36 square kilometres (86.24 sq mi).

The Park lies within Kuyavian-Pomeranian Voivodeship, in the region of the town of Chełmno, stretching along the right bank of the Vistula river. It forms a complex with the Vistula Landscape Park on the opposite bank. From 1999 to 2003 these areas constituted a single Landscape Park, called the Lower Vistula Valley Landscape Park (Park Krajobrazowy Doliny Dolnej Wisły). The two parks have a common administration located in Świecie.
