= Marzenna Drab =

Polish politician (born 1956)

Marzenna Stefania Drab
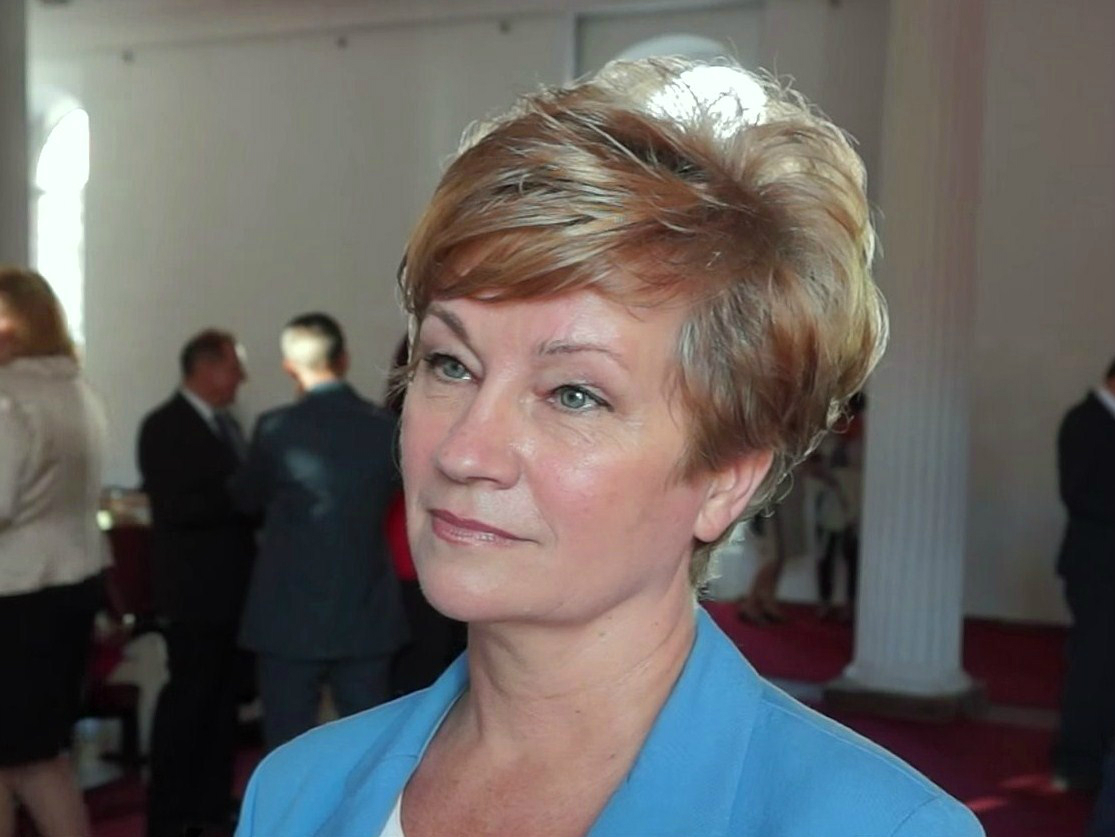

Member of the Sejm
- Incumbent
- Assumed office 5 November 2007
- Constituency: 5 – Toruń

Acting Governor of Kuyavian-Pomeranian Voivodeship
- In office 2006-07-24 – 2006-11-07
- Preceded by: Józef Ramlau
- Succeeded by: Zbigniew Hoffmann

Personal details
- Born: February 20, 1956 (age 70) Grudziądz, Poland
- Party: Law and Justice

Marzenna Stefania Drab (born 20 February 1956 in Grudziądz) is a Polish politician who is a member of the Sejm of Poland (since 2007) and former acting Governor of Kuyavian-Pomeranian Voivodeship (2006).

She graduated Nicolaus Copernicus University in Toruń. She worked in Polish Army, Grudziądz City Office and bank PKO BP. Between 1992 and 2004 she worked in Public Work Office (Polish: powiatowy urząd pracy) and in City Office again as Secretary of Grudziądz City.

On 27 January 2006 she was nominated as Vice-Governor of Kuyavian-Pomeranian Voivodeship in Kazimierz Marcinkiewicz Cabinet. Between 24 July and 7 November 2006 she was an Acting Governor.

On 21 October 2007, in parliamentary election, she joined the Sejm of Poland VI term (the lower house of the Polish parliament). She polled 7,396 votes and was fourth on the Law and Justice list. Her term was started on 5 November 2007.

== See also ==
- List of Sejm members (2007–2011)
- Kuyavian-Pomeranian Voivodeship
