= Zbigniew Hoffmann =

Polish politician (born 1963)

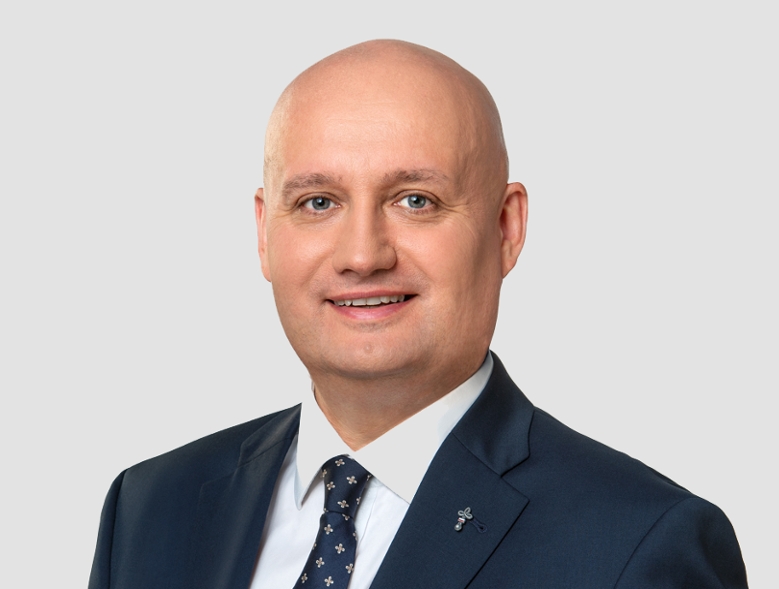

4th Voivode of Kuyavian-Pomeranian Voivodeship
- In office 2006-11-07 – 2007-11-29
- Preceded by: Marzenna Drab (acting)
- Succeeded by: Rafał Bruski

Vice-Voivode of Greater Poland Voivodeship
- In office 2006 – 2006-11-06

Personal details
- Born: 5 July 1963 (age 62) Poznań, Poland
- Party: Centre Agreement; Law and Justice

Zbigniew Grzegorz Hoffmann (Polish pronunciation: [zbʲ'igɲɛf gʐ'ɛgɔʂ x'ɔffmann]; born 5 July 1963 in Poznań) is a former Polish politician who was a Voivode of Kuyavian-Pomeranian Voivodeship (2006–2009) and a Vice-Voivode of Greater Poland Voivodeship (2006).

Between 1992 and 2000 he working in Greater Poland Voivodeship Office, and since 1997 as an assistant of Voivode. Between 2000 and 2006 he working for President (Mayor) of Poznań City. In 2006 he was a Vice-Voivode of Greater Poland Voivodeship.

On 7 November 2006 he was nominated as Voivode of Kuyavian-Pomeranian Voivodeship (Polish: wojewoda kujawsko-pomorski). He was a Voivode until 29 November 2007.

== See also ==
- Kuyavian-Pomeranian Voivodeship
- Greater Poland Voivodeship
