= Kuyavian–Pomeranian Voivodeship =

Voivodeship of Poland

Coordinates: 53°04′42″N 18°29′37″E

Kuyavian–Pomeranian Voivodeship Województwo kujawsko-pomorskie
- Voivodeship
- Flag Coat of arms Brandmark

- Location within Poland

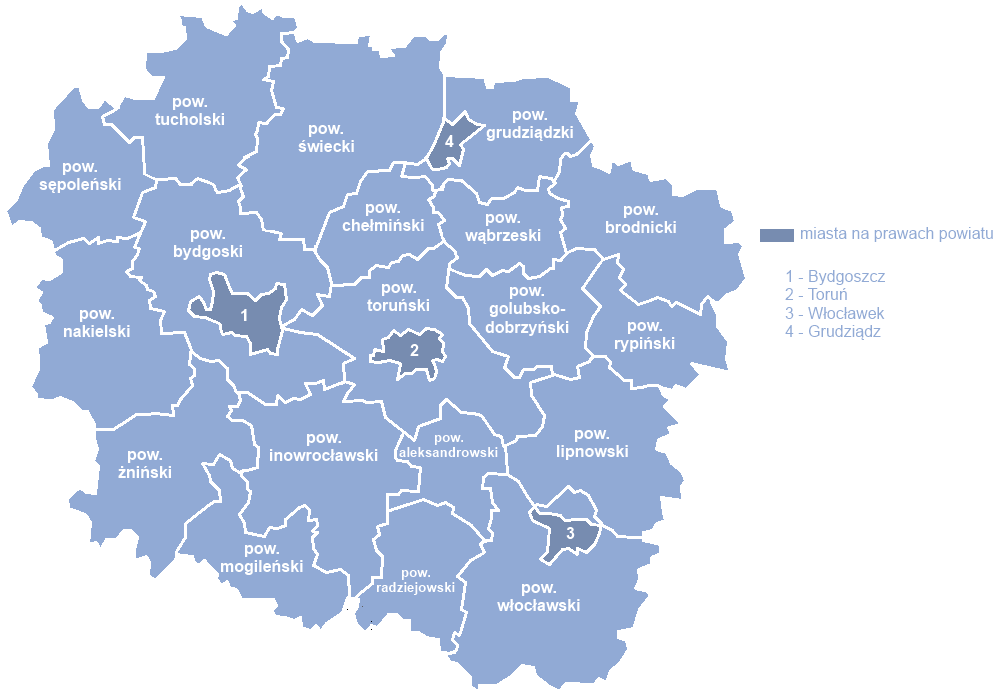
- Division into counties
- Country: Poland
- Capitals: Bydgoszcz (voivode), Toruń (executive board, Sejmik)
- Counties: 4 cities, 19 land counties *: Bydgoszcz; Grudziądz; Toruń; Włocławek; Aleksandrów County; Brodnica County; Bydgoszcz County; Chełmno County; Golub-Dobrzyń County; Grudziądz County; Inowrocław County; Lipno County; Mogilno County; Nakło County; Radziejów County; Rypin County; Sępólno County; Świecie County; Toruń County; Tuchola County; Wąbrzeźno County; Włocławek County; Żnin County

Government
  - Body: Kuyavian–Pomeranian Voivodeship executive board
  - Voivode: Michał Sztybel (KO)
  - Marshal: Piotr Całbecki (KO)
  - EP: Kuyavian–Pomeranian

Area
  - Total: 17,969 km^{2} (6,938 sq mi)

Population (2019)
  - Total: 2,074,517
  - Density: 115.45/km^{2} (299.01/sq mi)
  - Urban: 1,223,809
  - Rural: 850,708

GDP
  - Total: €35.719 billion (2024)
  - Per capita: €18,604 (2024)
- Time zone: UTC+1 (CET)
  - Summer (DST): UTC+2 (CEST)
- ISO 3166 code: PL-04
- Vehicle registration: C
- HDI (2021): 0.858 very high · 14th
- Website: www.kujawsko-pomorskie.pl
- further divided into 144 gminas

Kuyavian–Pomeranian Voivodeship (Polish: województwo kujawsko-pomorskie [vɔjɛˈvut͡stfɔ kuˈjafskɔ pɔˈmɔrskʲɛ]) is one of Poland's 16 voivodeships (provinces).

It was created on 1 January 1999 and is situated in mid-northern Poland, on the boundary between the two historic regions, from which it takes its name: Kuyavia (Polish: Kujawy) and Pomerania (Polish: Pomorze).

Its two chief cities, serving as the province's joint capitals, are Bydgoszcz and Toruń.

== History ==
The Kuyavian–Pomeranian Voivodeship was created on 1 January 1999, as a result of the Polish local government reforms adopted in 1998. It consisted of territory from the former Bydgoszcz, Toruń and Włocławek Voivodeships.

The area now known as Kuyavia–Pomerania was previously divided between the region of Kuyavia, Dobrzyń Land, Pomerania (including Chełmno Land and Kociewie), and Greater Poland (including Pałuki and Krajna). Of the two principal cities of today's Kuyavian–Pomeranian voivodeship, one (Bydgoszcz) was historically located in Kuyavia, while the other (Toruń) was an important town of Chełmno Land.

== Administration and territory ==
The functions of regional capital are split between Bydgoszcz and Toruń. Bydgoszcz serves as the seat of the centrally appointed governor or voivode (Polish: wojewoda), while Toruń is the seat of the elected Regional Assembly (sejmik), and of the executive elected by that assembly, headed by the voivodeship marshal (marszałek województwa).

The Kuyavian–Pomeranian Voivodeship is bordered by five other voivodeships. These are Pomeranian Voivodeship to the north, Warmian–Masurian Voivodeship to the north-east, Masovian Voivodeship to the east, Łódź Voivodeship across a short boundary to the south, and Greater Poland Voivodeship to the south and west.

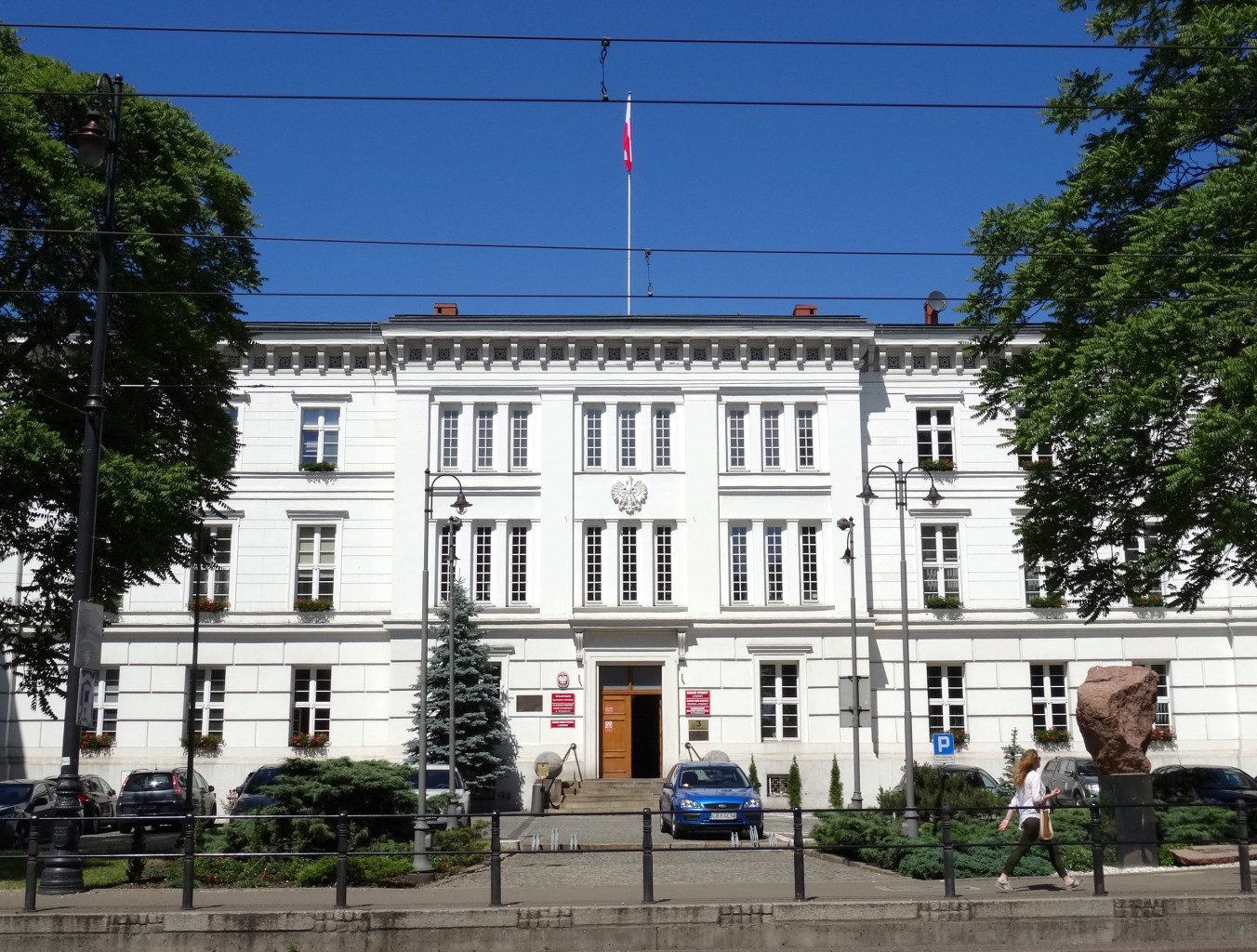
Voivodeship Office in Bydgoszcz

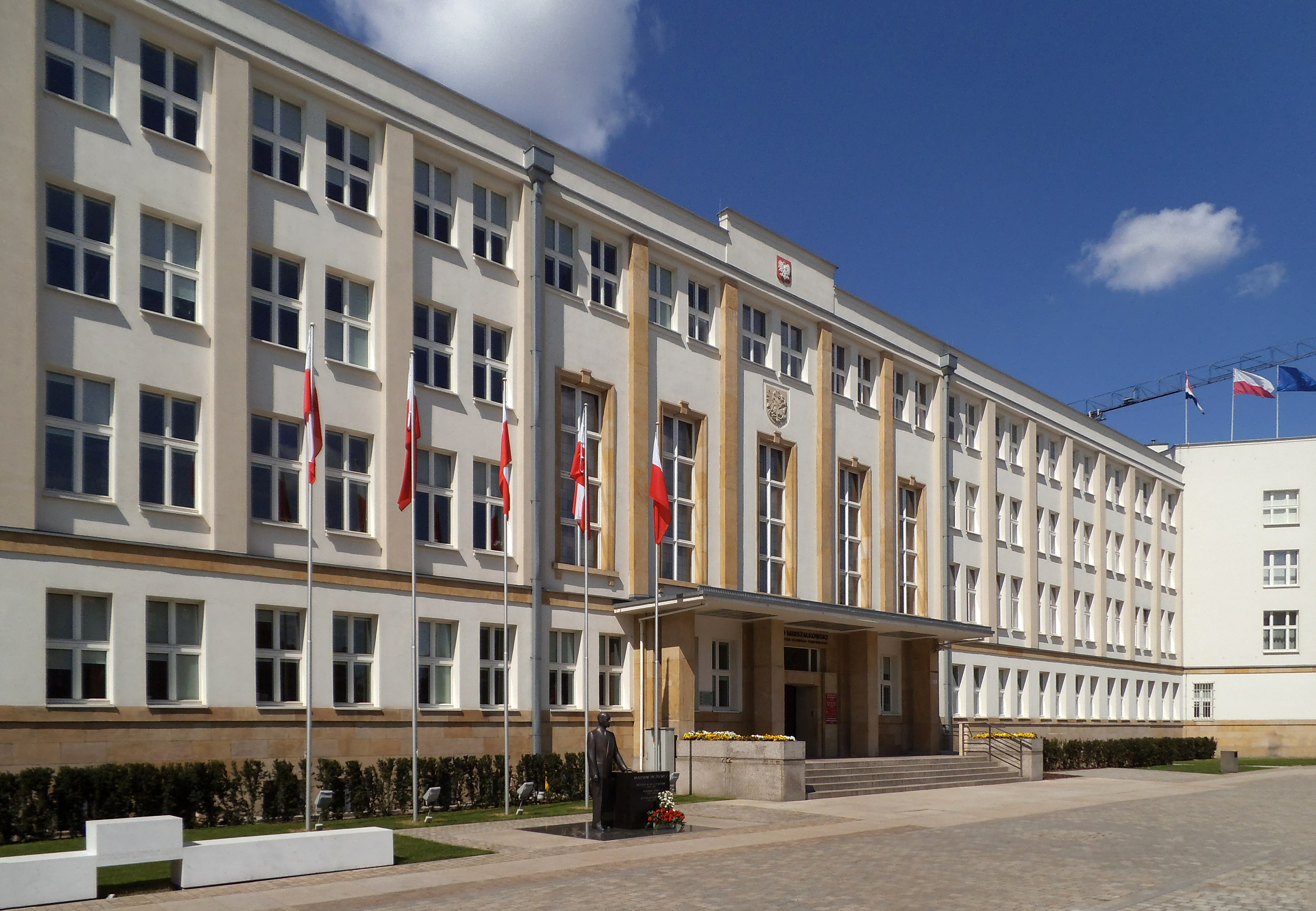
Voivodeship Sejmik in Toruń

== Cities and towns ==
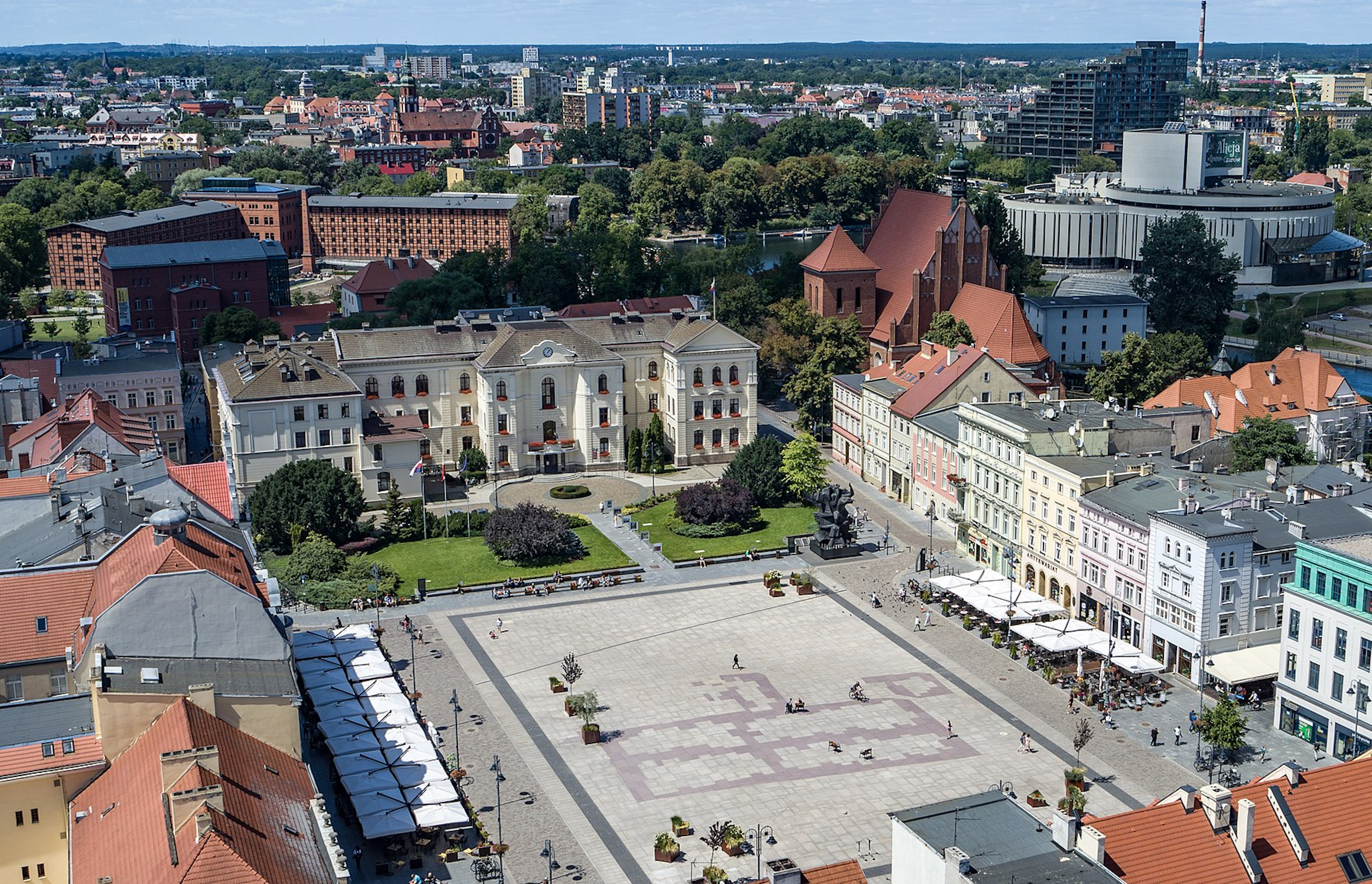
Bydgoszcz is the Voivodeship's largest city and the seat of its governor (Voivode)

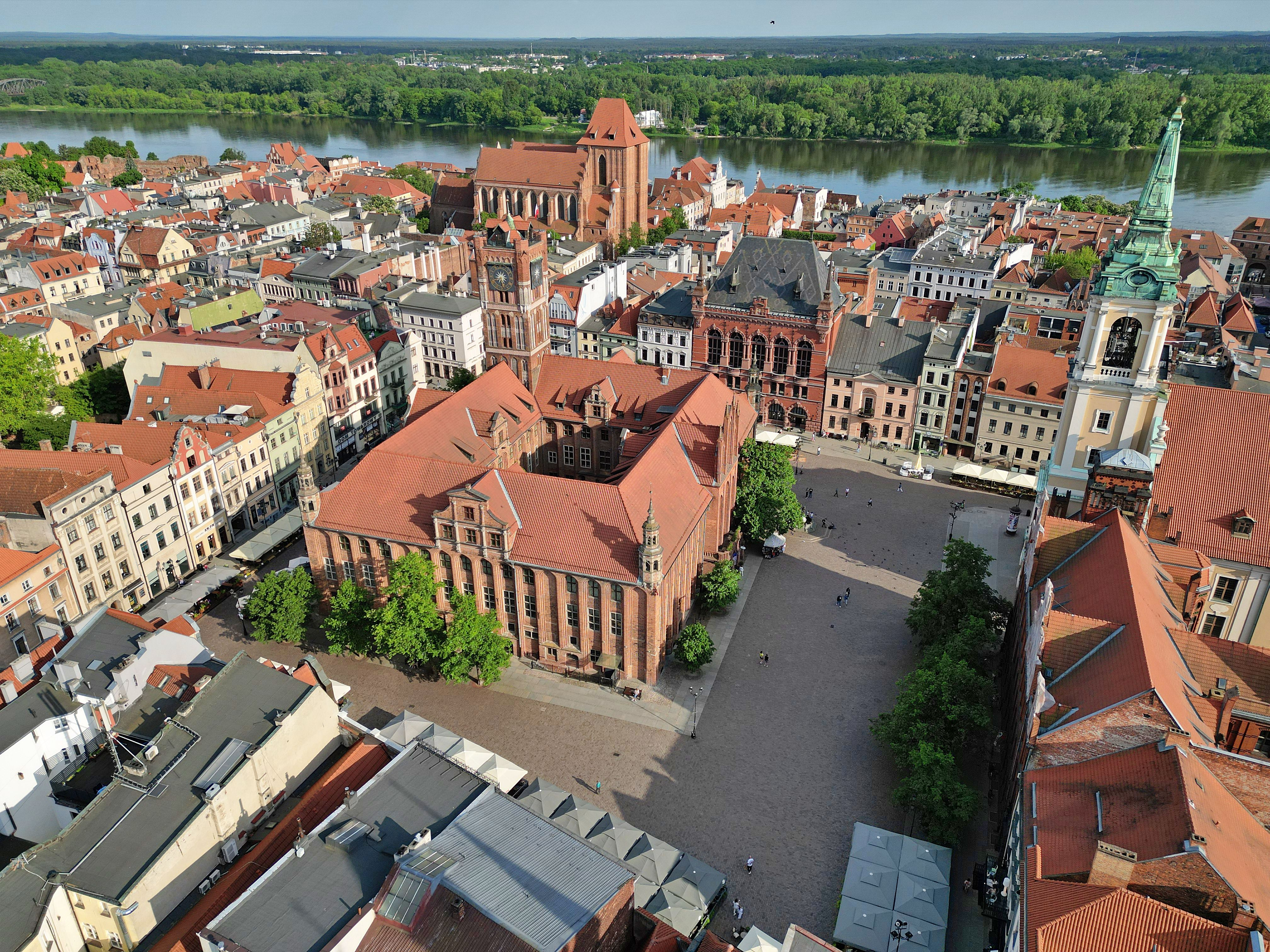
The medieval city of Toruń, birthplace of Nicholas Copernicus, is today the seat of the provincial assembly

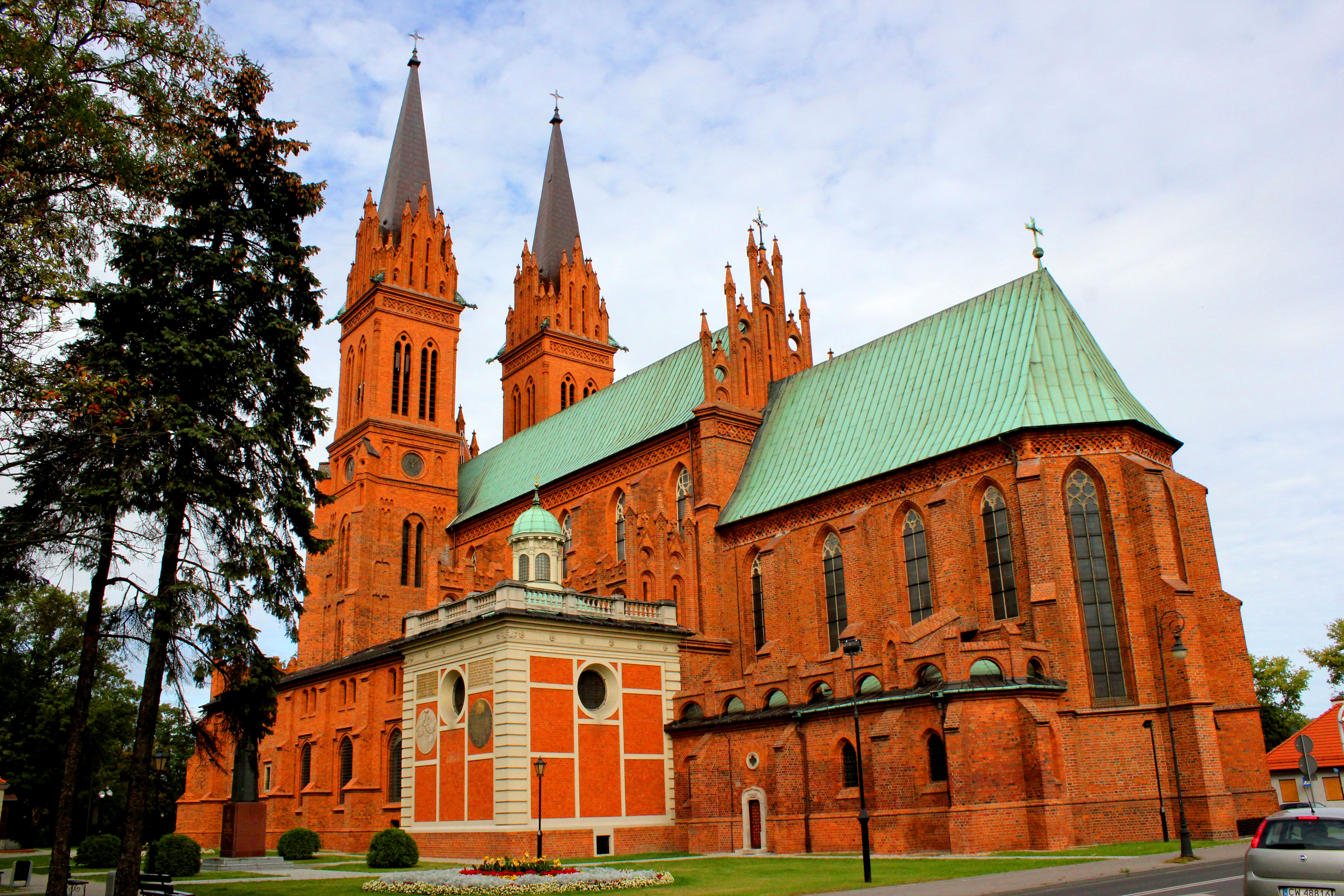
Włocławek Cathedral, an example of Polish Gothic architecture

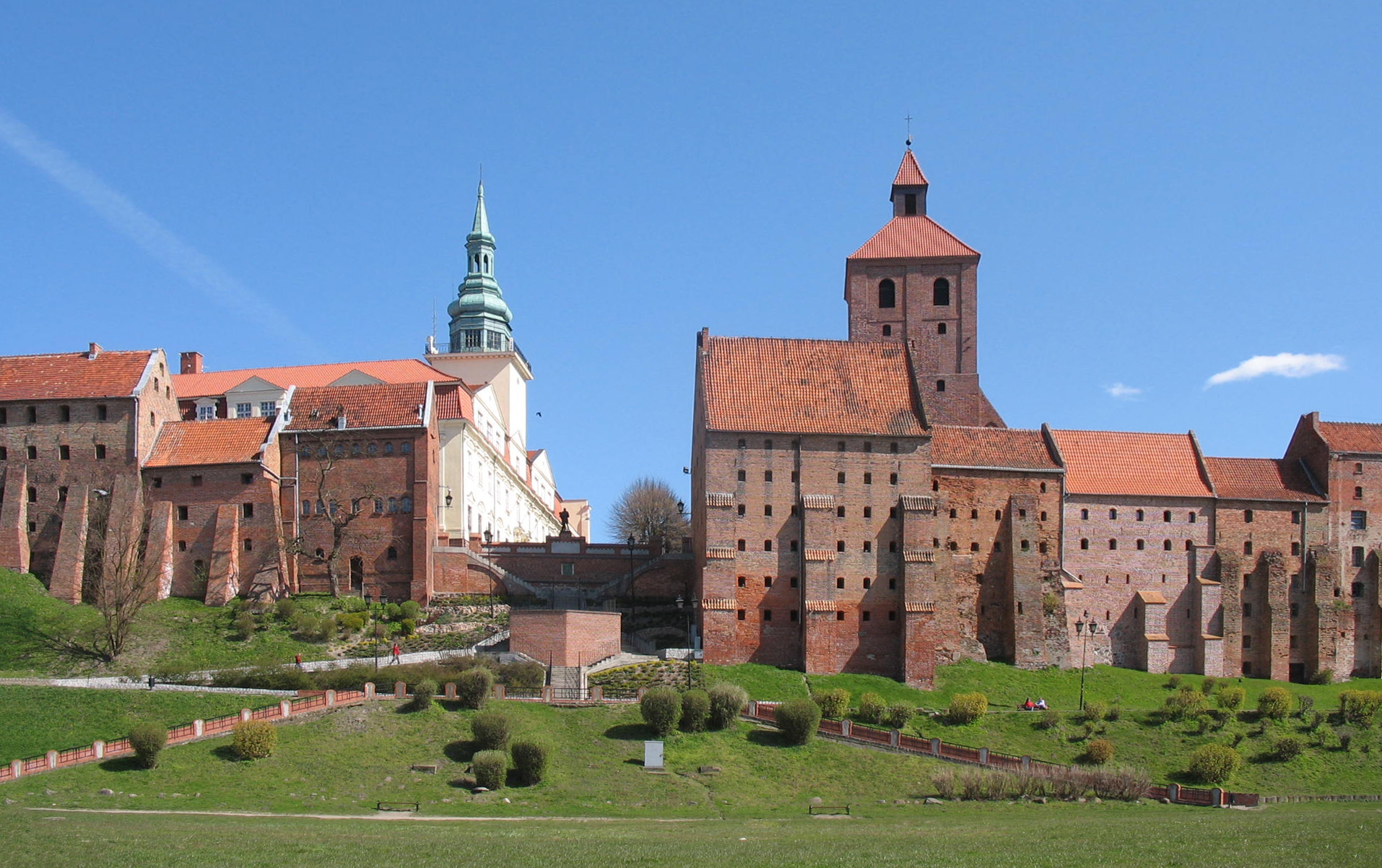
The medieval city of Grudziądz, with its intact granaries along the Vistula River

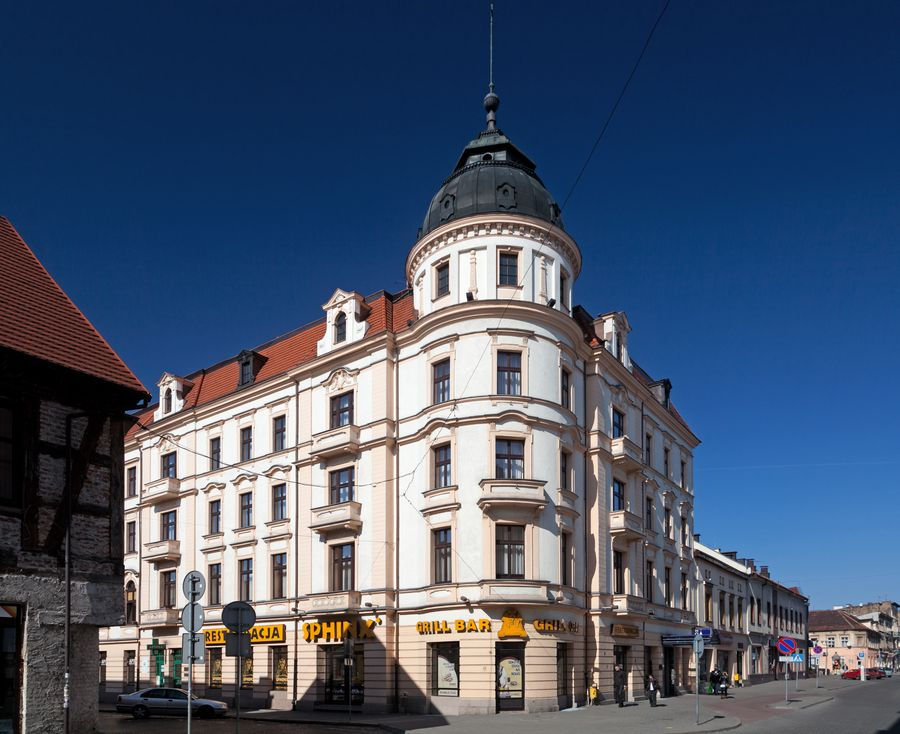
Inowrocław is famous for its large salt spa and resort centre

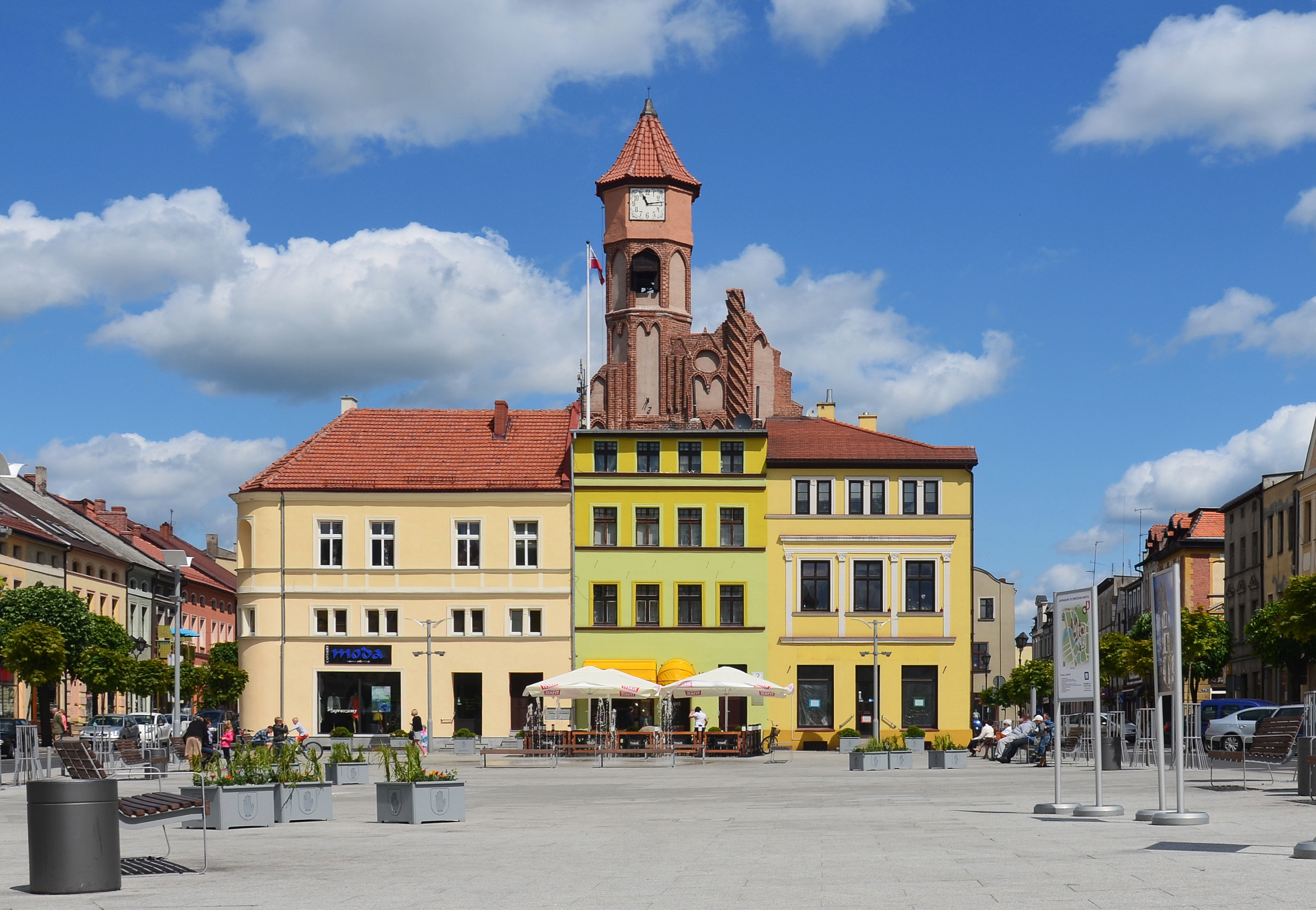
Brodnica – market square

Historical population
Year	Pop.	±%
1988	2,044,049	—
2002	2,069,321	+1.2%
2011	2,097,635	+1.4%
2021	2,027,261	−3.4%

There are 5 cities and 47 towns in the voivodeship. These are listed below in descending order of population (according to official figures for 2019):

Cities (governed by a city mayor or prezydent miasta):
1. Bydgoszcz (349,021)
2. Toruń (201,798)
3. Włocławek (110,287)
4. Grudziądz (94,732)
5. Inowrocław (72,786)

Towns:

1. Brodnica (28,788)
2. Świecie (25,723)
3. Chełmno (19,605)
4. Nakło nad Notecią (18,281)
5. Rypin (16,227)
6. Solec Kujawski (15,652)
7. Chełmża (14,503)
8. Lipno (14,399)
9. Żnin (13,864)
10. Tuchola (13,621)
11. Wąbrzeźno (13,570)
12. Golub-Dobrzyń (12,563)
13. Aleksandrów Kujawski (12,147)
14. Mogilno (11,836)
15. Koronowo (11,162)
16. Ciechocinek (10,590)
17. Szubin (9,556)
18. Sępólno Krajeńskie (9,091)
19. Kruszwica (8,809)
20. Janikowo (8,745)
21. Barcin (7,408)
22. Gniewkowo (7,110)
23. Więcbork (5,950)
24. Nowe (5,827)
25. Pakość (5,706)
26. Strzelno (5,631)
27. Radziejów (5,578)
28. Kcynia (4,657)
29. Brześć Kujawski (4,642)
30. Łabiszyn (4,472)
31. Piotrków Kujawski (4,456)
32. Mrocza (4,350)
33. Kowalewo Pomorskie (4,130)
34. Janowiec Wielkopolski (3,953)
35. Jabłonowo Pomorskie (3,754)
36. Skępe (3,620)
37. Kowal (3,484)
38. Łasin (3,254)
39. Lubraniec (2,999)
40. Izbica Kujawska (2,609)
41. Kamień Krajeński (2,390)
42. Dobrzyń nad Wisłą (2,127)
43. Chodecz (1,894)
44. Nieszawa (1,853)
45. Radzyń Chełmiński (1,847)
46. Lubień Kujawski (1,391)
47. Górzno
48. Kikół
49. Pruszcz
50. Gąsawa
51. Bobrowniki

== Economy ==
The Gross domestic product (GDP) of the province was 21.8 billion euros in 2018, accounting for 4.4% of Polish economic output. GDP per capita adjusted for purchasing power was 17,300 euros or 57% of the EU27 average in the same year. The GDP per employee was 64% of the EU average.

In 2024 the Kuyavian–Pomeranian Voivodeship had over 228,000 registered business entities. More than 60% of firms were located in urban areas, particularly around Bydgoszcz and Toruń. The region ranked eighth in Poland in industrial output in 2024, with the food industry playing a leading role alongside wood and paper, electrical machinery, and chemical production. Agriculture remains a key sector, with the region ranking among the national leaders in livestock and crop production, especially potatoes and sugar beets.

== Transportation ==
Transportation infrastructure is of critical importance to the voivodeship's economy. Kuyavia-Pomerania is a major node in the Polish transportation system. Railway lines from the South and East pass through Bydgoszcz to connect to the major ports on the Baltic Sea. In addition to this, Bydgoszcz is home to the rolling stock manufacturer PESA SA, Poland's largest and most modern producer of railway and tram products. The province's sole international airport, Ignacy Jan Paderewski Airport, is located in Bydgoszcz and has connections to a number of European destinations as well as Warsaw, which are all operated by either Irish carrier Ryanair or LOT Polish Airlines.

The main railway stations of the province are Bydgoszcz main station and Toruń main station; both stations are served by fast PKP Intercity trains which connect them with the capital Warsaw, as well as other major Polish cities. In addition to these fast express services, iregional trains on electrified lines are operated by the Polregio , while regional rail transportation on unelectrified lines within the voivodeship are provided by Arriva RP, a private firm to which the provincial government subcontracted the provision of rail transport.

The A1 and S5 highways pass through the province, with the S10 also under construction.

All major towns of the province have municipal transportation companies operating buses, while Bydgoszcz, Toruń and Grudziądz also have extensive tram systems.

== Politics ==
The Kuyavian-Pomeranian voivodeship's government is headed by the province's voivode (governor) who is appointed by the Polish Prime Minister. The voivode is then assisted in performing his duties by the voivodeship's marshal, who is the appointed speaker for the voivodeship's executive and is elected by the sejmik (provincial assembly). The current voivode of Kuyavia-Pomerania is Ewa Monika Mes, and the present marshal is Piotr Całbecki.

The Sejmik of Kuyavia-Pomerania consists of 33 members.

Kuyavian-Pomeranian Regional Assembly elections on 21 November 2010
Party	Votes	%	Total seats held
Civic Platform (PO)	218,004	33.81	16
Law and Justice (PiS)	114,557	17.77	6
Democratic Left Alliance (SLD)	111,885	17.35	6
Polish People's Party (PSL)	93,445	14.49	5
Others	106,877	16.58	0
Total	644,768	100.00	33
Votes counted: 741,828; Valid votes: 644,768; Turnout: 44.96%

=== Governors ===
Name	Period
Józef Rogacki	1 January 1999 – 21 October 2001
Romuald Kosieniak	21 October 2001 – 26 January 2006
Józef Ramlau	26 January 2006 – 24 July 2006
Marzenna Drab (acting)	24 July 2006 – 7 November 2006
Zbigniew Hoffmann	7 November 2006 – 29 November 2007
Rafał Bruski	29 November 2007 – 13 December 2010
Ewa Mes	14 December 2010–present

== Administrative divisions ==
The Kuyavian–Pomeranian Voivodeship is divided into 23 counties (powiats): 4 city counties and 19 land counties. These are further divided into 144 gminas.

The counties are listed in the following table (ordering within categories is by decreasing population).

English and Polish names	Area (km^{2})	Population (2019)	Seat	Other towns	Total gminas
City counties
Bydgoszcz	175	349,021			1
Toruń	116	201,798			1
Włocławek	84	110,287			1
Grudziądz	58	94,732			1
Land counties
Inowrocław County powiat inowrocławski	1,225	160,216	Inowrocław	Kruszwica, Janikowo, Gniewkowo, Pakość	9
Bydgoszcz County powiat bydgoski	1,395	118,041	Bydgoszcz *	Solec Kujawski, Koronowo	8
Toruń County powiat toruński	1,230	107,641	Toruń *	Chełmża	9
Świecie County powiat świecki	1,473	99,154	Świecie	Nowe, Pruszcz	11
Nakło County powiat nakielski	1,120	86,449	Nakło nad Notecią	Szubin, Kcynia, Mrocza	5
Włocławek County powiat włocławski	1,472	86,131	Włocławek *	Brześć Kujawski, Kowal, Lubraniec, Izbica Kujawska, Chodecz, Lubień Kujawski	13
Brodnica County powiat brodnicki	1,039	78,935	Brodnica	Jabłonowo Pomorskie, Górzno	10
Żnin County powiat żniński	985	70,234	Żnin	Barcin, Łabiszyn, Janowiec Wielkopolski, Gąsawa	6
Lipno County powiat lipnowski	1,016	65,869	Lipno	Skępe, Dobrzyń nad Wisłą, Kikół, Bobrowniki	9
Aleksandrów County powiat aleksandrowski	476	55,150	Aleksandrów Kujawski	Ciechocinek, Nieszawa	9
Chełmno County powiat chełmiński	528	52,018	Chełmno		7
Tuchola County powiat tucholski	1,075	48,329	Tuchola		6
Mogilno County powiat mogileński	676	45,756	Mogilno	Strzelno	4
Golub-Dobrzyń County powiat golubsko-dobrzyński	613	45,059	Golub-Dobrzyń	Kowalewo Pomorskie	6
Rypin County powiat rypiński	587	43,618	Rypin		6
Sępólno County powiat sępoleński	791	41,055	Sępólno Krajeńskie	Więcbork, Kamień Krajeński	4
Radziejów County powiat radziejowski	607	40,546	Radziejów	Piotrków Kujawski	7
Grudziądz County powiat grudziądzki	728	40,181	Grudziądz *	Łasin, Radzyń Chełmiński	6
Wąbrzeźno County powiat wąbrzeski	501	34,297	Wąbrzeźno		5
* seat not part of the county

== Protected areas ==
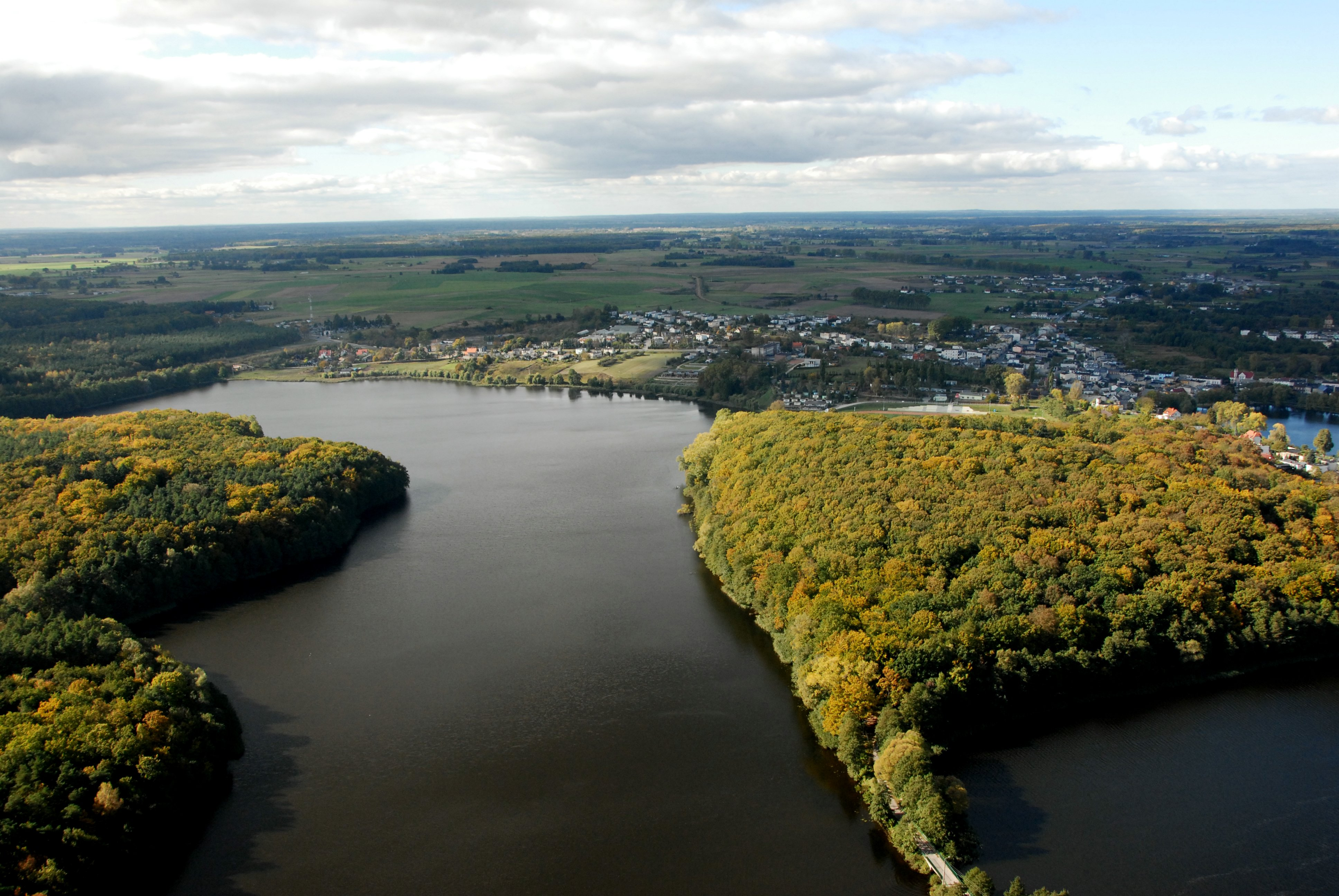
Krajna Landscape Park

Protected areas in Kuyavian–Pomeranian Voivodeship include the nine Landscape Parks listed below.

- Brodnica Landscape Park (partly in Warmian-Masurian Voivodeship)
- Chełmno Landscape Park
- Gopło Landscape Park
- Górzno-Lidzbark Landscape Park (partly in Masovian and Warmian-Masurian Voivodeships)
- Gostynin-Włocławek Landscape Park (partly in Masovian Voivodeship)
- Krajna Landscape Park
- Tuchola Landscape Park (partly in Pomeranian Voivodeship)
- Vistula Landscape Park
- Wda Landscape Park

== Sights and tourism ==
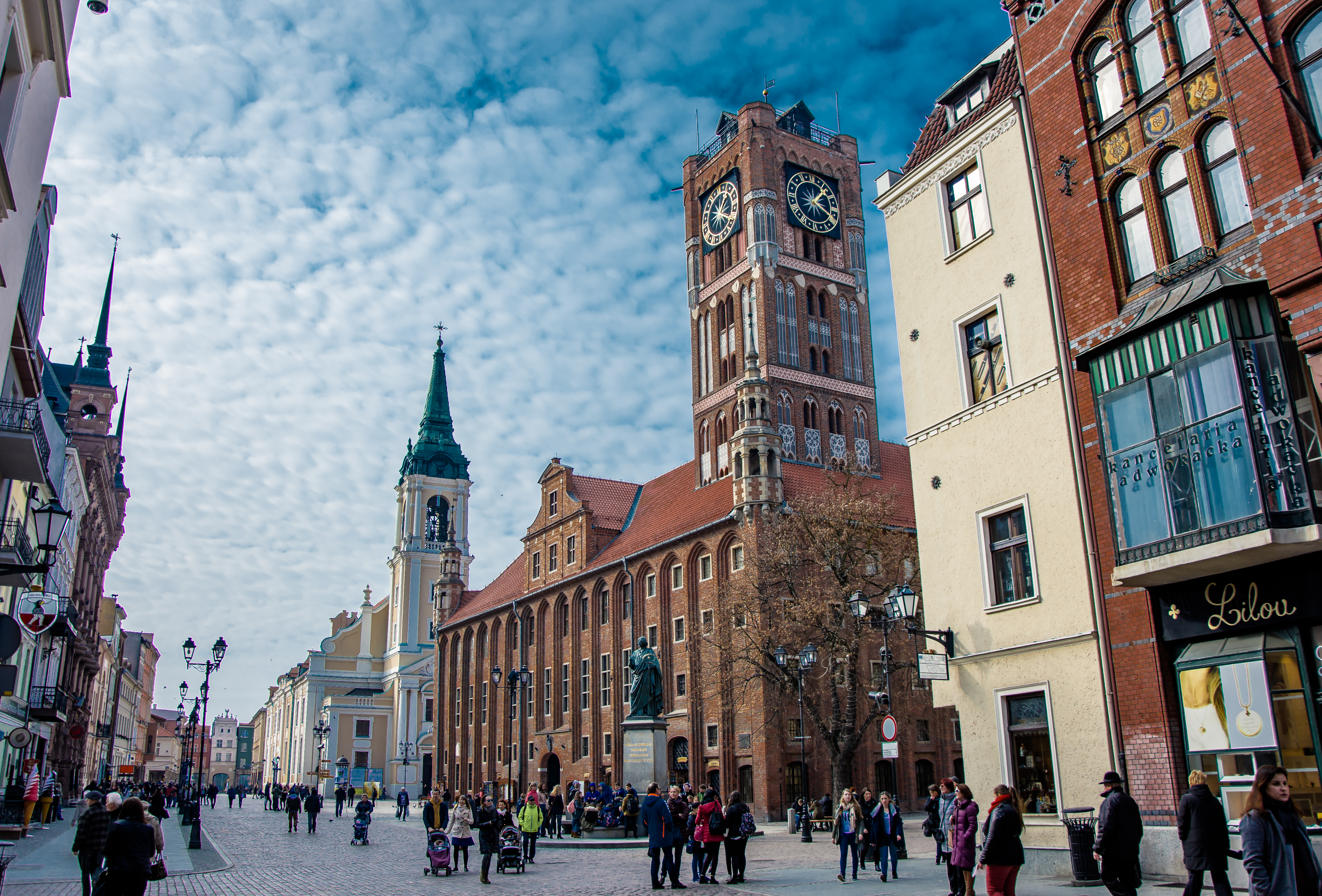
Medieval Town of Toruń, a UNESCO World Heritage Site

There are eight Historic Monuments of Poland and one World Heritage Site in the voivodeship:

- Medieval Town of Toruń (listed as both)
- Old Town of Chełmno
- Biskupin archaeological reserve
- Graduation towers, saline and spa parks of Ciechocinek
- Grudziądz Granaries
- Lubostroń Palace and Park Complex
- Norbertine monastery complex with the Romanesque Saint Procopius Church and the Romanesque-Gothic-Baroque Holy Trinity Church in Strzelno
- Włocławek Cathedral

The region is rich in historic architecture ranging from Romanesque and Gothic architecture to Renaissance, Baroque and Art Nouveau. Other preserved historic old towns include Bydgoszcz, Grudziądz and Brodnica. There are also numerous castles, including Dybów, Golub, Radzyń Chełmiński, Świecie, and Zamek Bierzgłowski, preserved castle towers, including Brodnica and Kruszwica, and palaces, including Jabłonowo-Zamek, Ostromecko, Wąpielsk, and Żołędowo. The Dybów Castle was the place where in 1454 King Casimir IV Jagiellon issued the famous Statutes of Nieszawa, covering a set of privileges for the Polish nobility; an event that is regarded as the birth of the noble democracy in Poland, which lasted until the late-18th-century Partitions of Poland. The manor in Szafarnia was a place of stay for Fryderyk Chopin during his 1824 and 1825 summer vacations, and contains a museum dedicated to the composer.

Włocławek, Toruń and Bydgoszcz contain preserved Gothic cathedrals. Locations of historic monasteries include Chełmno, Grudziądz, Mogilno, Rywałd and Skępe. In Gąsawa, there is the 17th-century Saint Nicolas Church with a unique collection of multi-layered mural paintings, dating back several centuries.

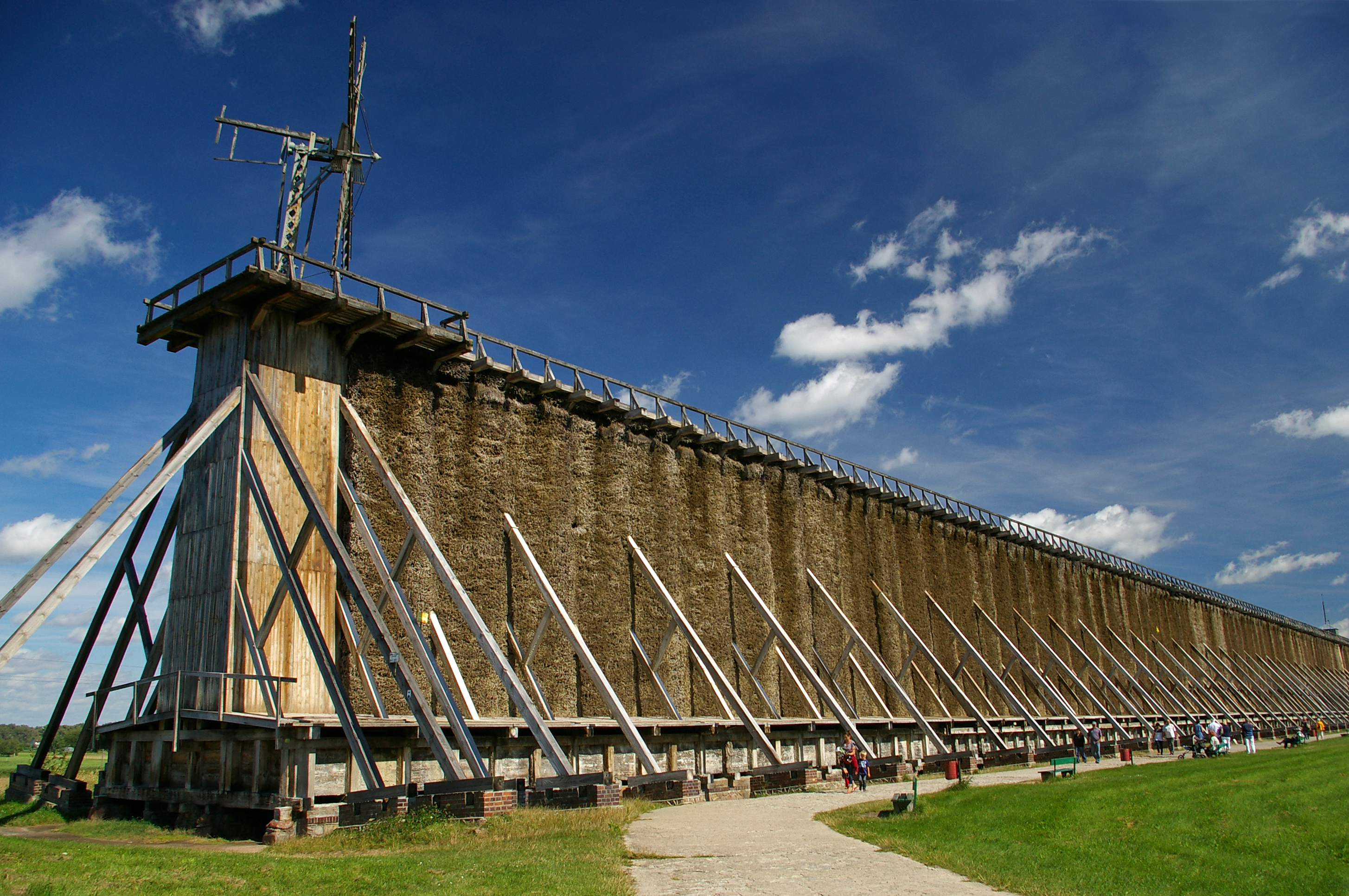
Graduation towers in Ciechocinek

There are three spa towns: Ciechocinek, Inowrocław and Wieniec-Zdrój.

Major museums and art galleries are located in Bydgoszcz, Toruń and Włocławek, including the Leon Wyczółkowski Regional Museum in Bydgoszcz, District Museum in Toruń and Museum of Kuyavia and Dobrzyń Land in Włocławek. The more unique museums include:

- Copernicus House in Toruń, museum dedicated to Nicolaus Copernicus
- European Museum of Money at the former Polish Royal Mint in Bydgoszcz
- Museum of Toruń Gingerbread in Toruń
- Museum of Far Eastern Art in the Under the Star Tenement House in Toruń
- Andrzej Szwalbe Collection of Historical Pianos at the palace in Ostromecko, one of two largest such collections in Poland
- Narrow Gauge Railway Museum in Wenecja
- Exploseum in Bydgoszcz, operated at the site of a former Nazi German arms factory.

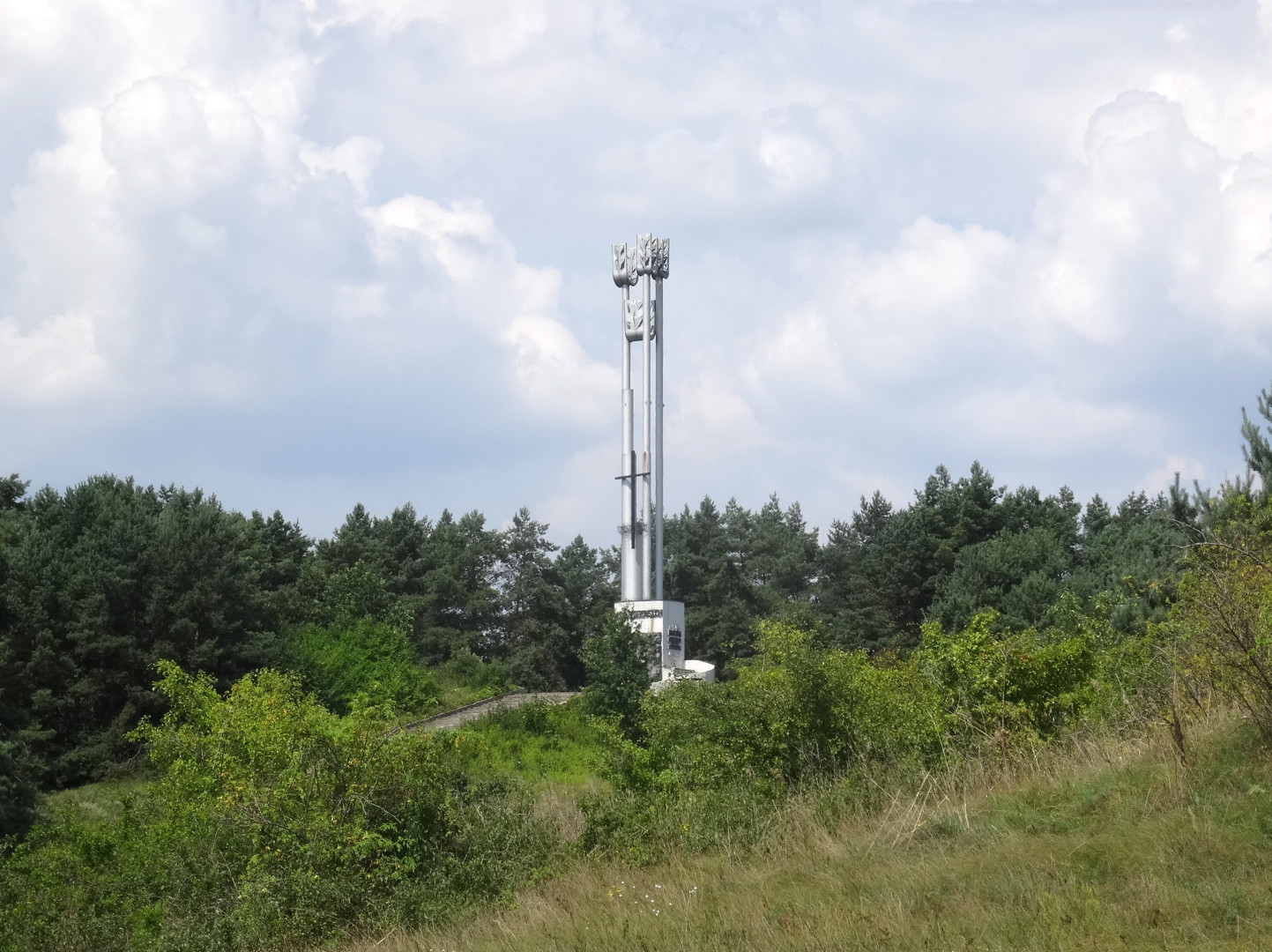
Monument to the victims of Nazi Germany at the Valley of Death (Bydgoszcz)

There are numerous World War II memorials in the province, including a memorial at the site of the former Potulice concentration camp, memorials at the sites of Nazi massacres of Poles, including the largest massacres at Mniszek, Gniewkowo, Klamry, Łopatki and Fordon, and memorials to Allied prisoners of war held by Nazi Germany in the region at the sites of the former Stalag XX-A, Oflag XXI-B and Oflag 64 POW camps in Toruń and Szubin.

Other notable sights include the Bydgoszcz Canal, connecting Bydgoszcz and Nakło nad Notecią, the Battle of Koronowo (1410) Monument, and monuments do distinguished people from the region, including cryptologist Marian Rejewski (birthplace and monument in Bydgoszcz), writer Jan Kasprowicz (childhood home and monument in Inowrocław), and surgeon Ludwik Rydygier, the first surgeon in the world to carry out a peptic ulcer resection (former clinic and monument in Chełmno).

== Sports ==
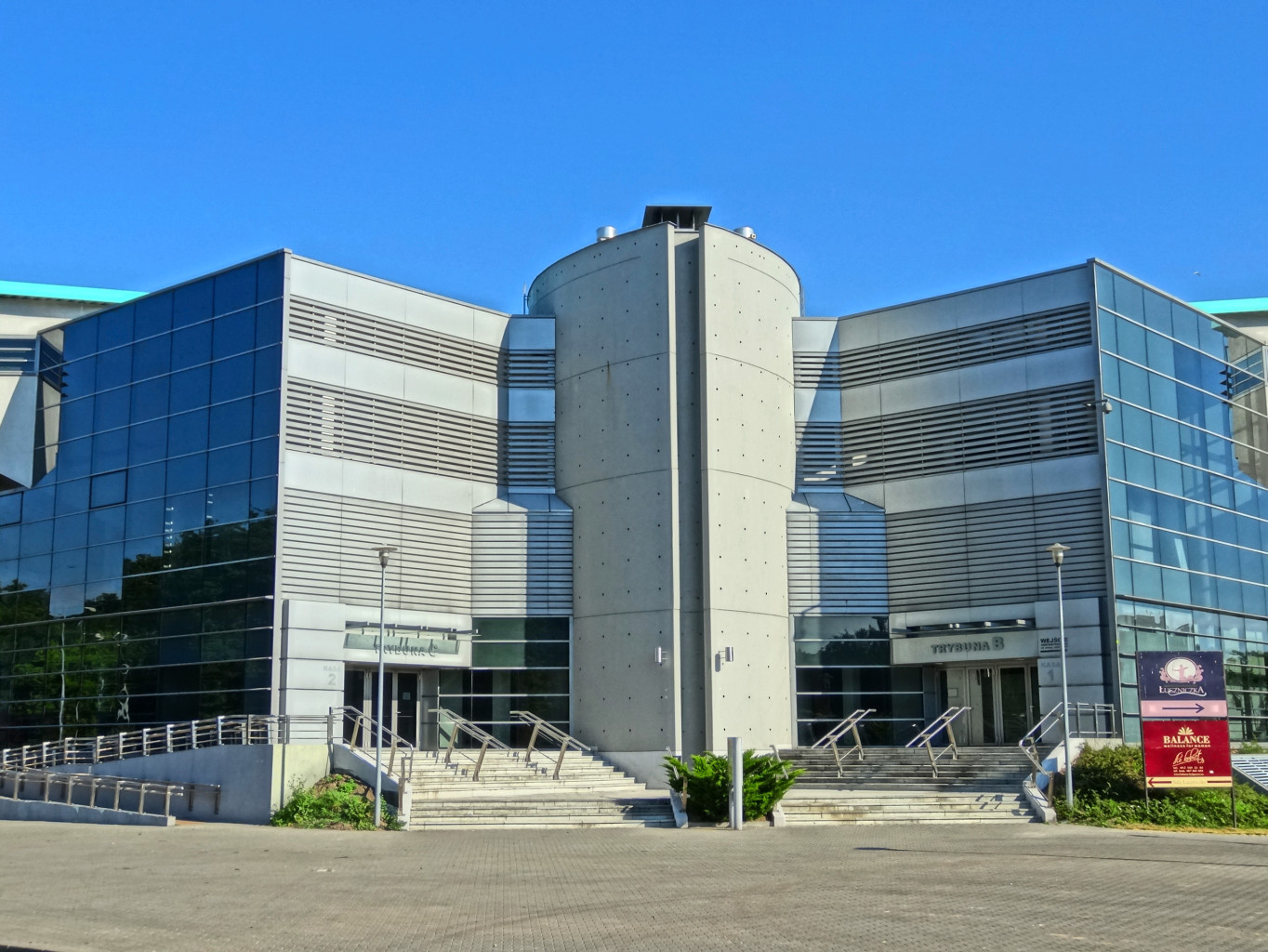
Łuczniczka, home venue of BKS Visła Bydgoszcz and Pałac Bydgoszcz volleyball teams

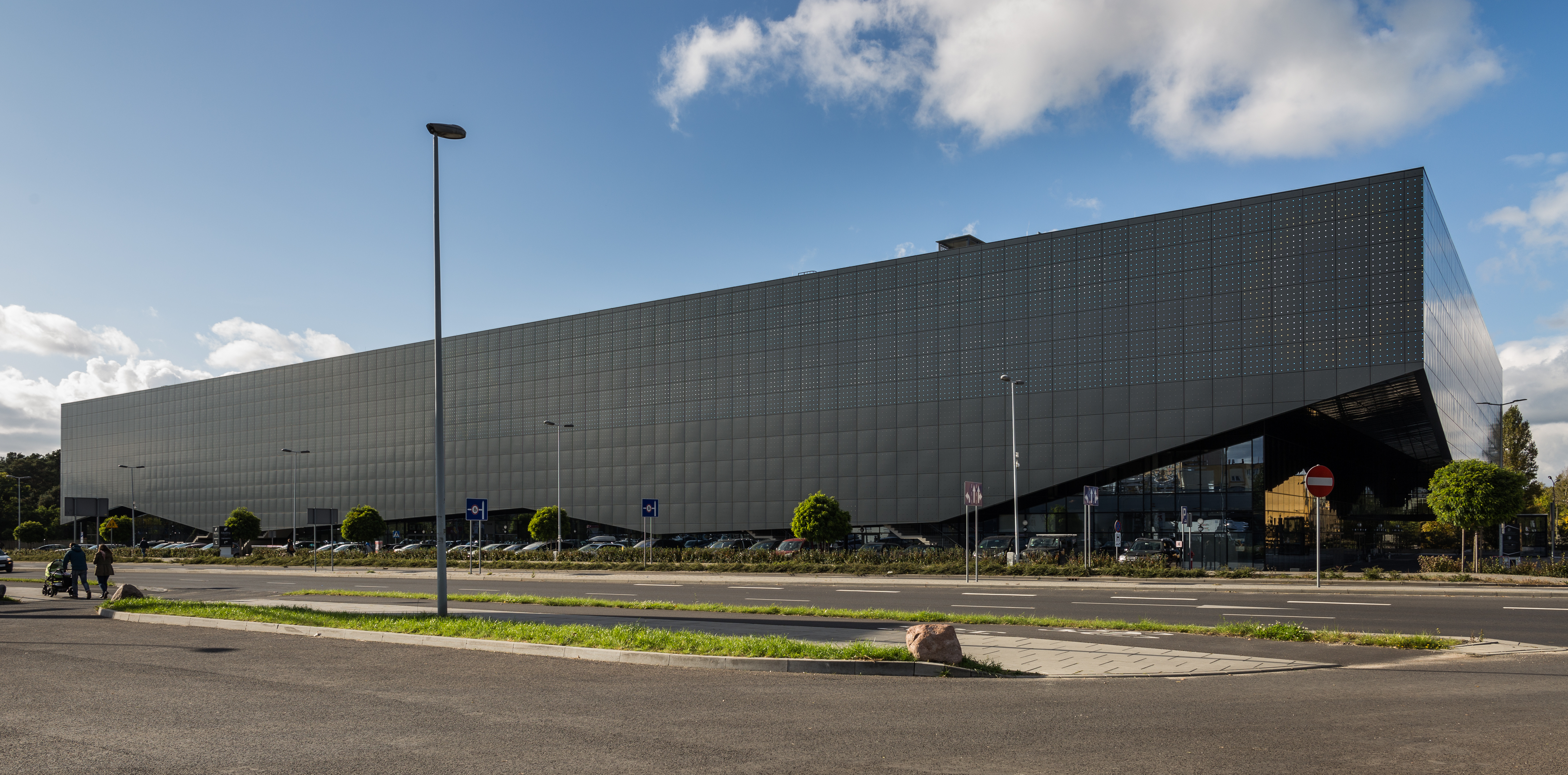
Kujawsko-Pomorska Arena Toruń, home venue of Twarde Pierniki, Katarzynki basketball teams and 2026 World Athletics Indoor Championships

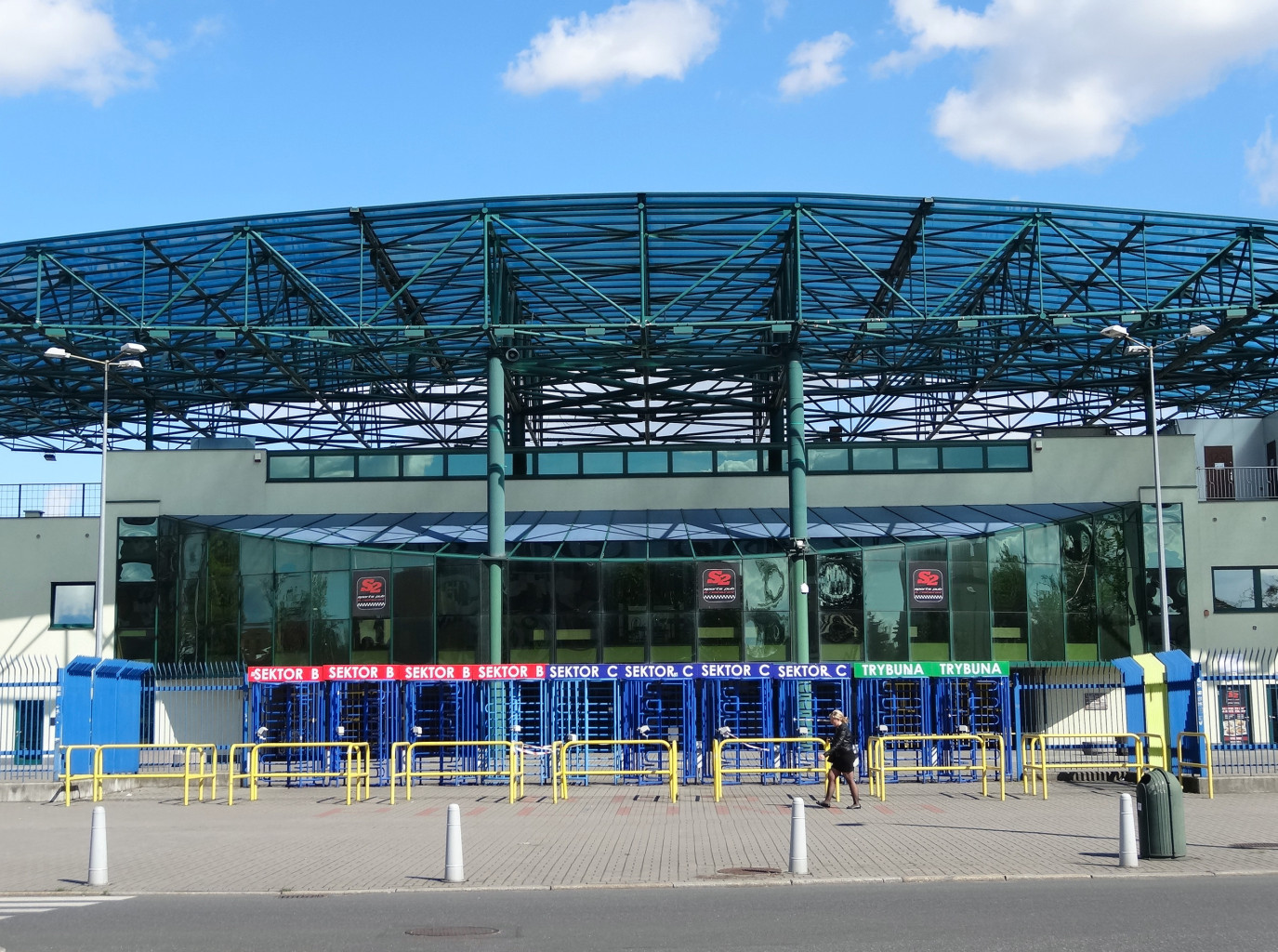
Józef Piłsudski Stadium, home venue of Polonia Bydgoszcz speedway and football teams, Speedway Grand Prix of Poland (1998, 1999, 2001–2010) and Speedway Grand Prix of Europe (2000, 2013, 2014)

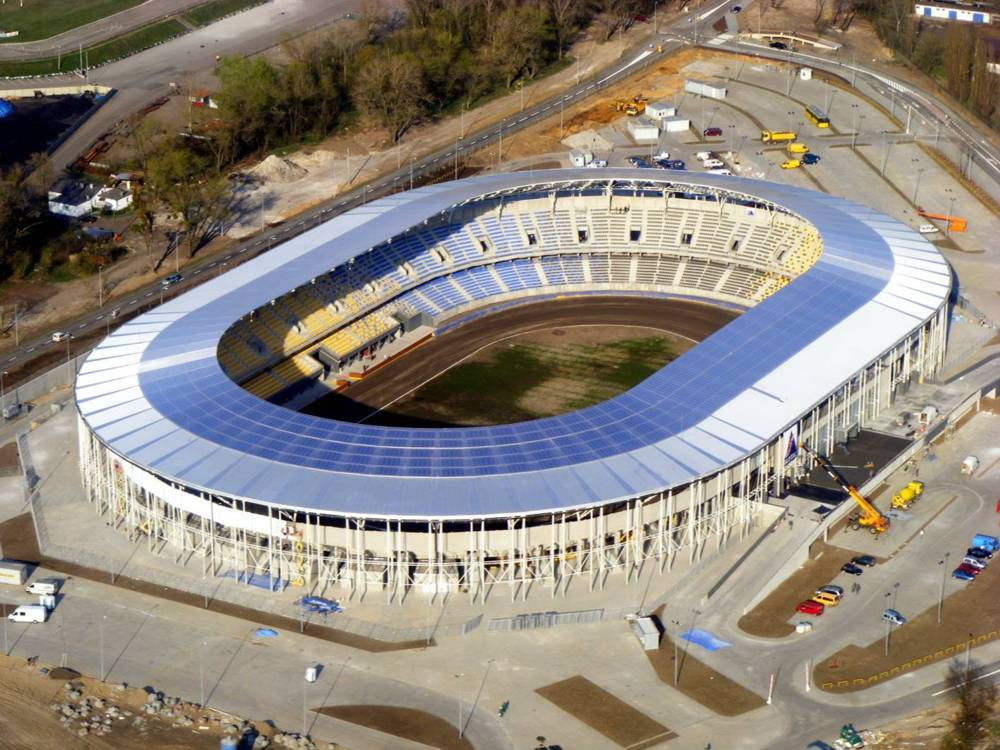
MotoArena speedway stadium, venue of KS Toruń, Speedway Grand Prix of Poland (2010–2024) and 2025 Speedway of Nations

Motorcycle speedway, basketball and volleyball have the largest following in the province. The KS Toruń and Polonia Bydgoszcz clubs are among the most accomplished speedway clubs in the country and contest the Pomeranian-Kuyavian Derby in speedway rivalries.

Professional sports teams
Club	Sport	League	Trophies
Polonia Bydgoszcz	Speedway	1 Liga	7 Polish Championships
KS Toruń	Speedway	Ekstraliga	6 Polish Championships
GKM Grudziądz	Speedway	Ekstraliga	0
Anwil Włocławek	Basketball (men's)	Polish Basketball League	3 Polish Championships (2003, 2018, 2019); 4 Polish Cups (1995, 1996, 2007, 2020); 1 FIBA Europe Cup (2023)
Twarde Pierniki Toruń	Basketball (men's)	Polish Basketball League	1 Polish Cup (2018)
Astoria Bydgoszcz	Basketball (men's)	I Liga	0
Noteć Inowrocław	Basketball (men's)	I Liga	0
Basket 25 Bydgoszcz	Basketball (women's)	Basket Liga Kobiet	1 Polish Cup (2018)
Katarzynki Toruń	Basketball (women's)	Basket Liga Kobiet	0
KS Toruń HSA	Ice hockey	Polska Hokej Liga	1 Polish Cup (2005)
BKS Visła Bydgoszcz	Volleyball (men's)	I liga	0
Anioły Toruń	Volleyball (men's)	I liga	0
Pałac Bydgoszcz	Volleyball (women's)	Tauron Liga	1 Polish Championship (1993); 3 Polish Cups (1992, 2001, 2005)
Sokół Mogilno	Volleyball (women's)	I liga	0
Zawisza Bydgoszcz	Football (men's)	II liga	1 Polish Cup (2014)
Olimpia Grudziądz	Football (men's)	II liga	0
Elana Toruń	Football (men's)	III liga	0
KKP Bydgoszcz	Football (women's)	I liga	0
FC Toruń	Futsal (men's)	Ekstraklasa	0
Pomorzanin Toruń	Field hockey (men's)	Superliga	3 Polish Championships (1990, 2014, 2023)
Bydgoszcz Archers	American football	Polish Football League	1 Polish Championship (2021)
Angels Toruń	American football	Polish Football League	

Since the establishment of the province, several major international sports competitions were co-hosted by the province:

- EuroBasket 2009,
- 2009 Women's European Volleyball Championship,
- 2010 IAAF World Cross Country Championships,
- EuroBasket Women 2011,
- 2013 IAAF World Cross Country Championships,
- 2014 FIVB Volleyball Men's World Championship,
- 2019 FIFA U-20 World Cup,
- 2025 Speedway of Nations,
- 2026 World Athletics Indoor Championships.

== Curiosities ==
- Brześć Kujawski, Bydgoszcz, Dobrzyń nad Wisłą, Gniewkowo and Inowrocław were medieval ducal seats of the Piast dynasty.
- Bydgoszcz and Toruń, although not capitals of Poland, hosted sessions of the Polish Parliament. Bydgoszcz in 1520, Toruń in 1576 and 1626.
- Toruń served as the temporary Polish capital in 1809.
- Medieval municipal rights modelled after Chełmno, known as Chełmno rights, became the basis of municipal form of government for various cities and towns of the region and beyond, including Warsaw.
- The Kuyavian–Pomeranian Voivodeship is one of four first-level administrative divisions containing the name of the historic region of Pomerania, the other being the Pomeranian Voivodeship and West Pomeranian Voivodeship in Poland, and Mecklenburg-Vorpommern in Germany.

== Gallery ==
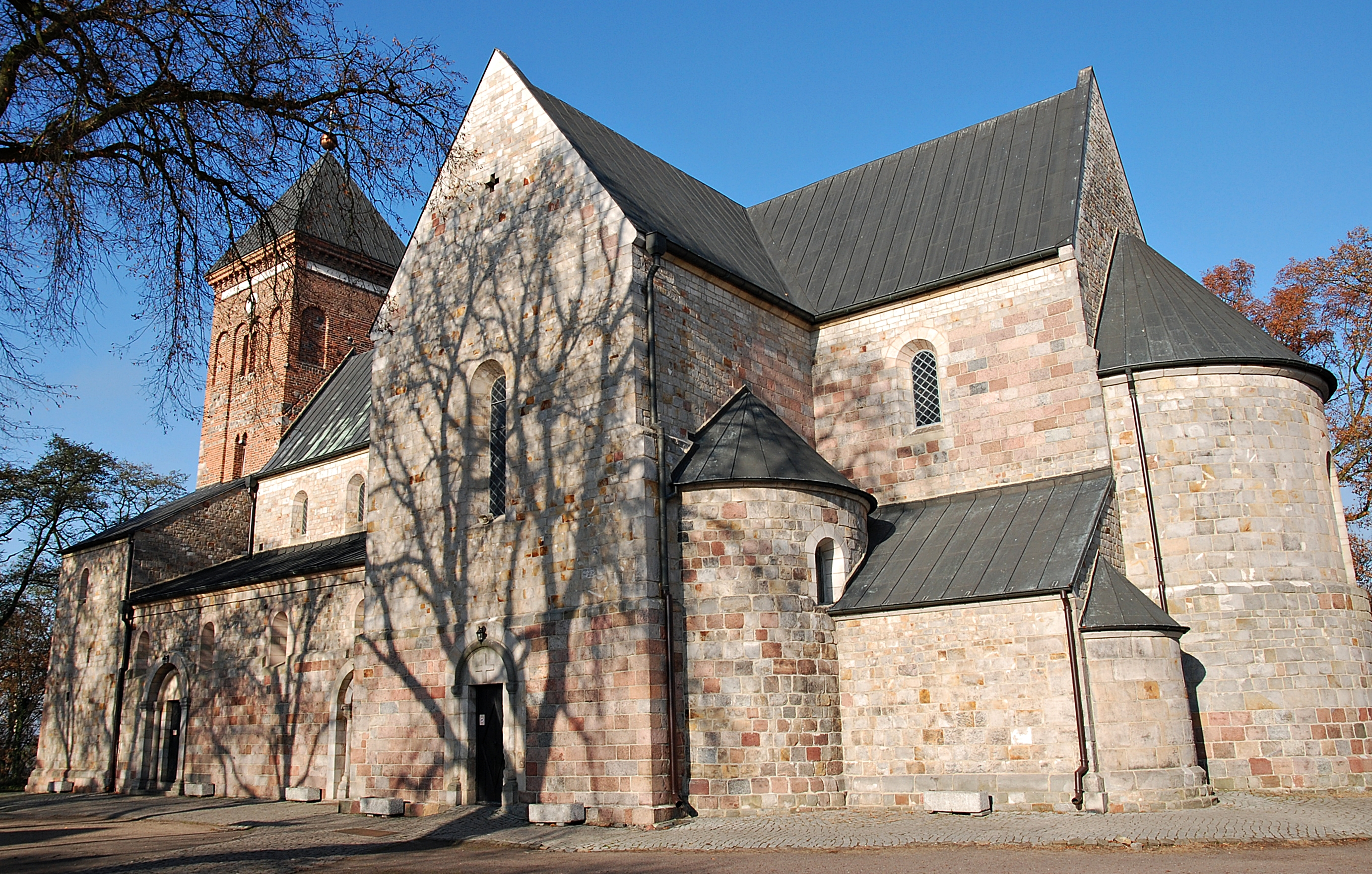
Collegiate Church of St. Peter and St. Paul in Kruszwica

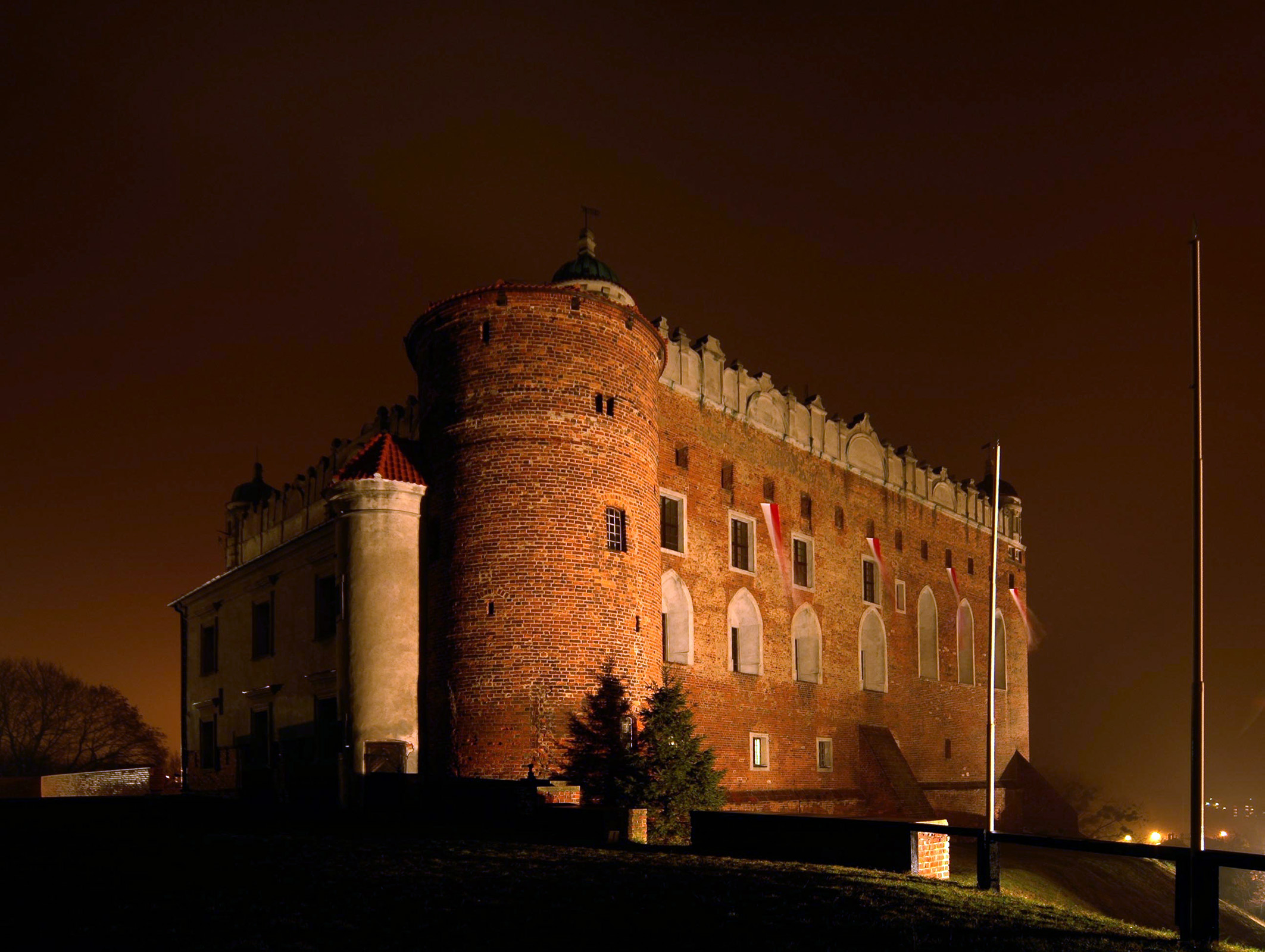
Golub Castle

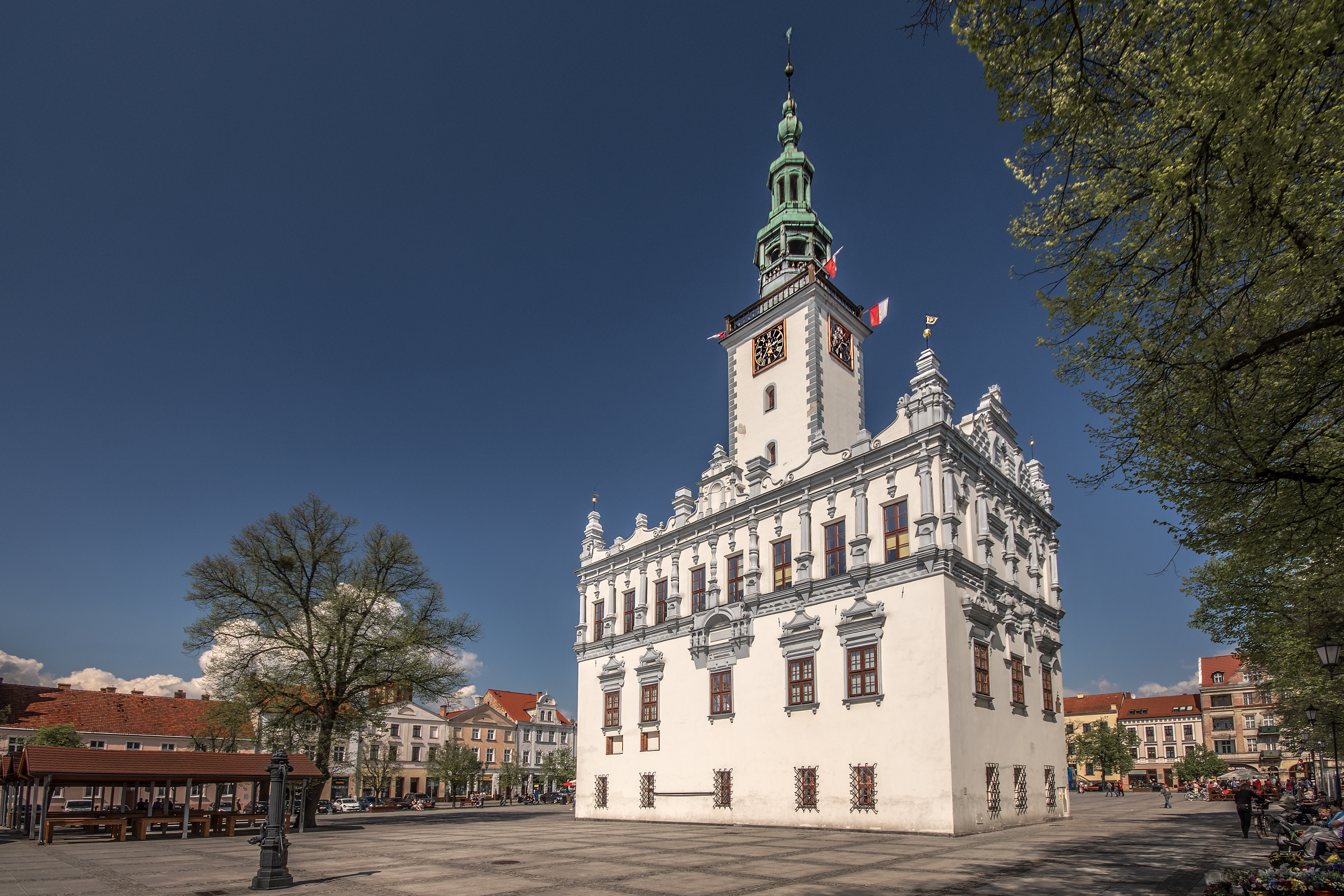
Market Square in Chełmno

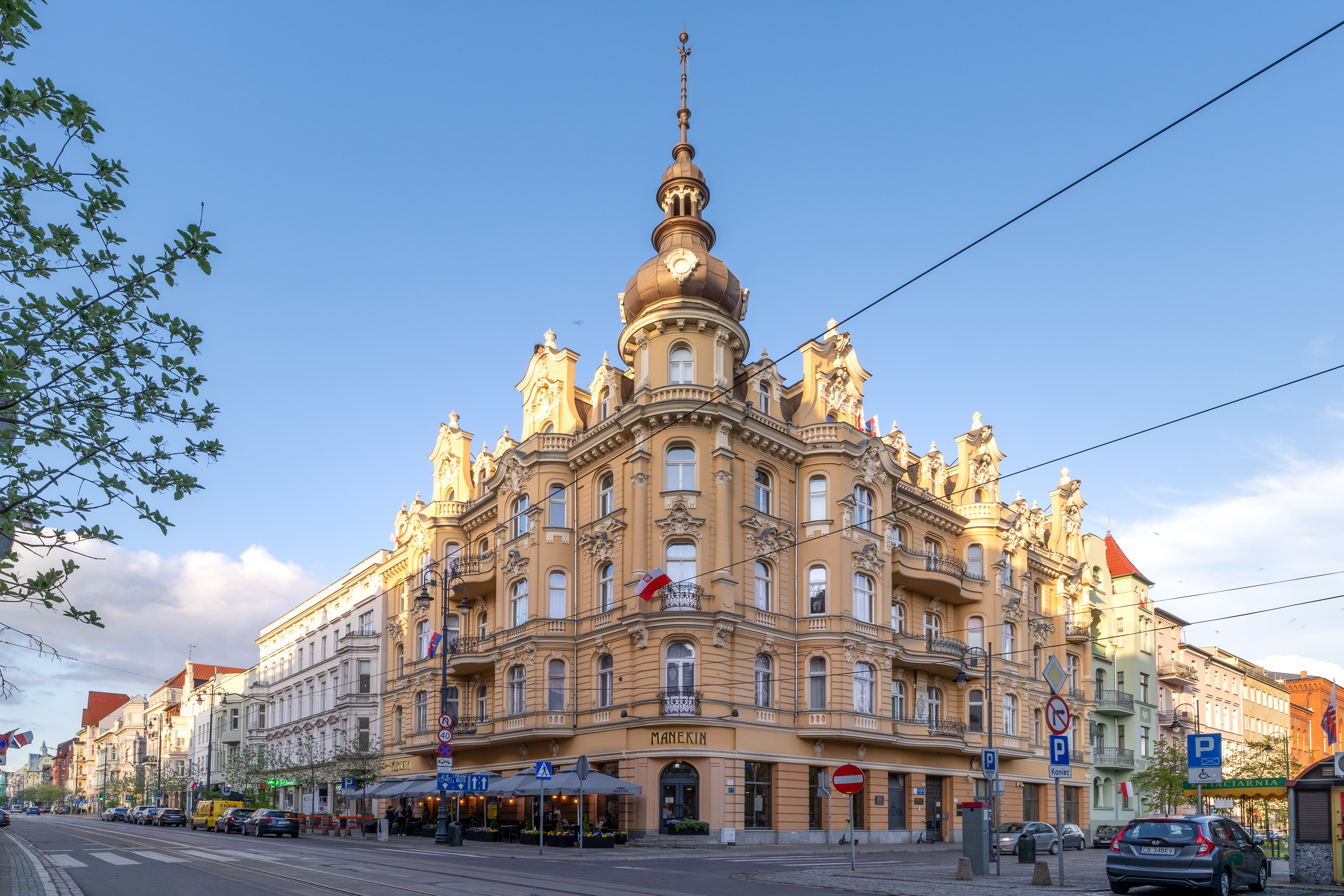
Freedom Square in Bydgoszcz

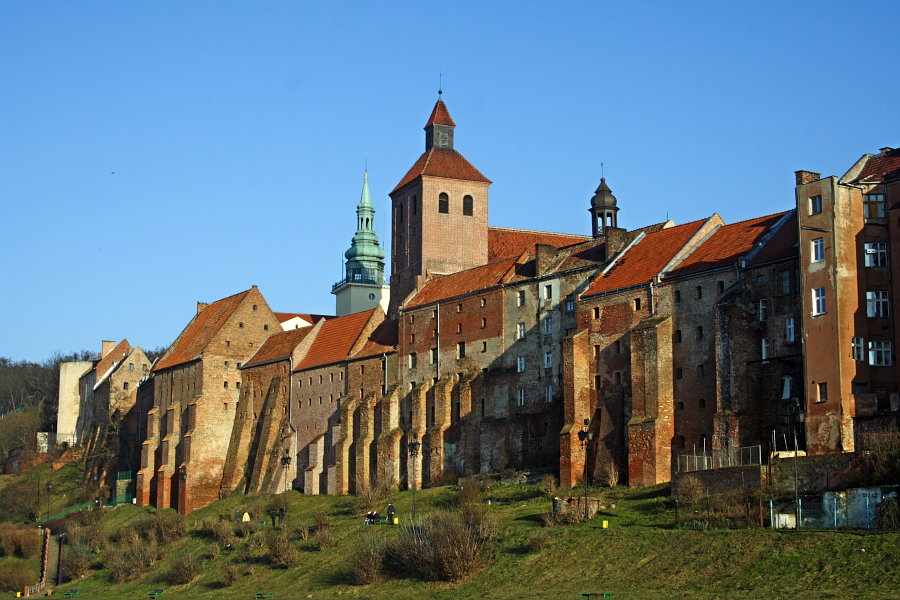
Grudziądz Granaries

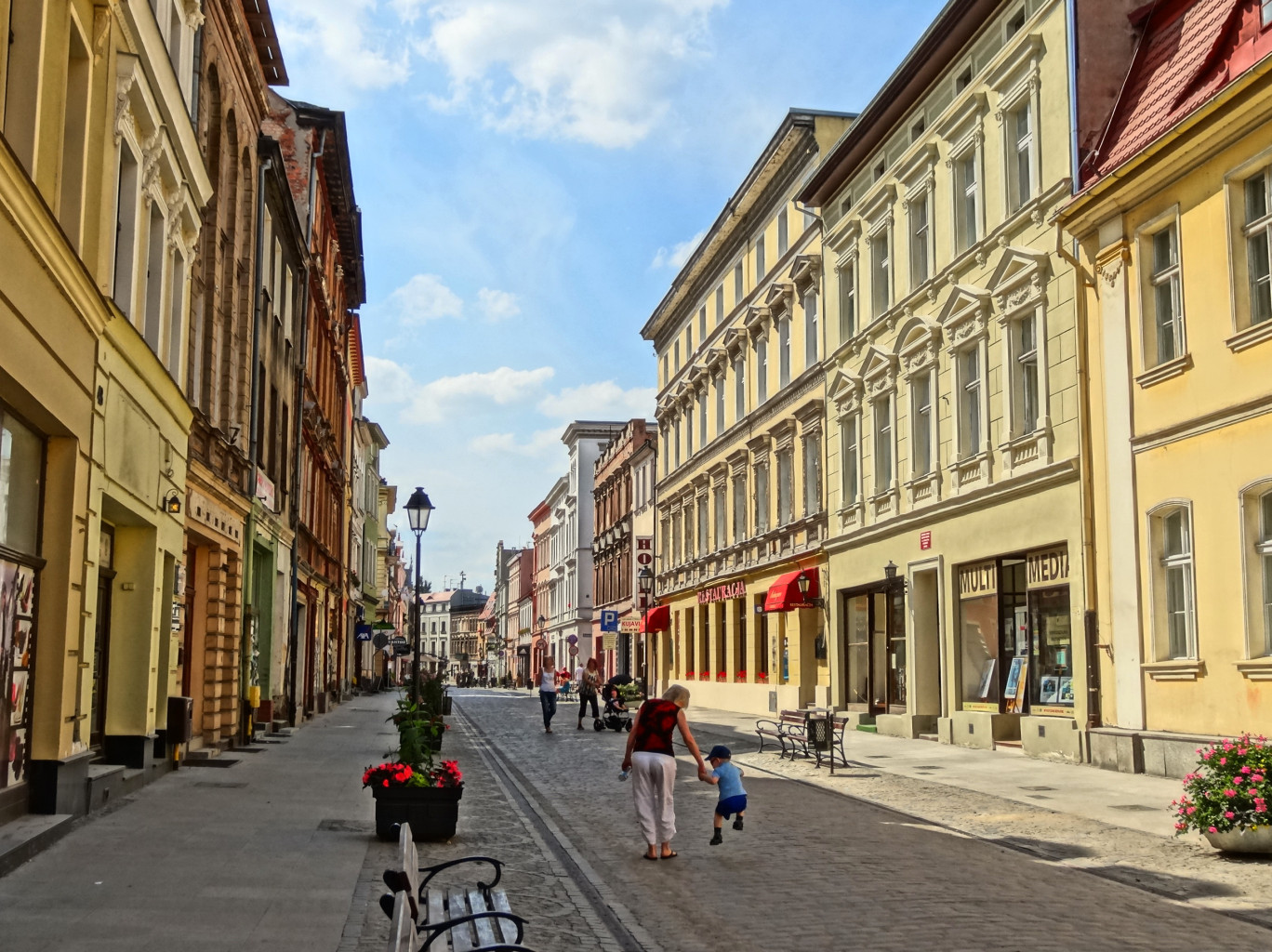
Bydgoszcz Old Town

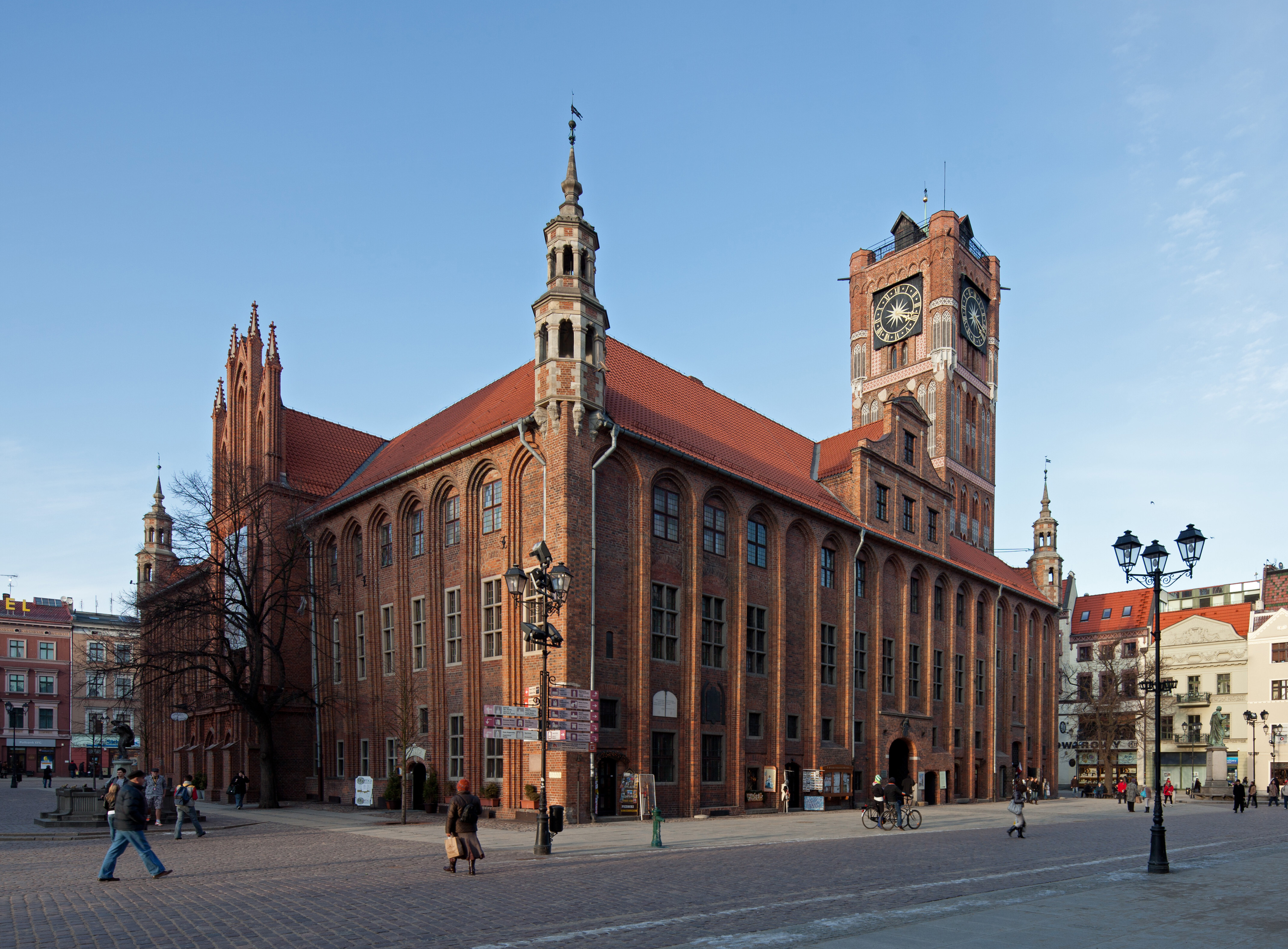
Old Town Hall in Toruń

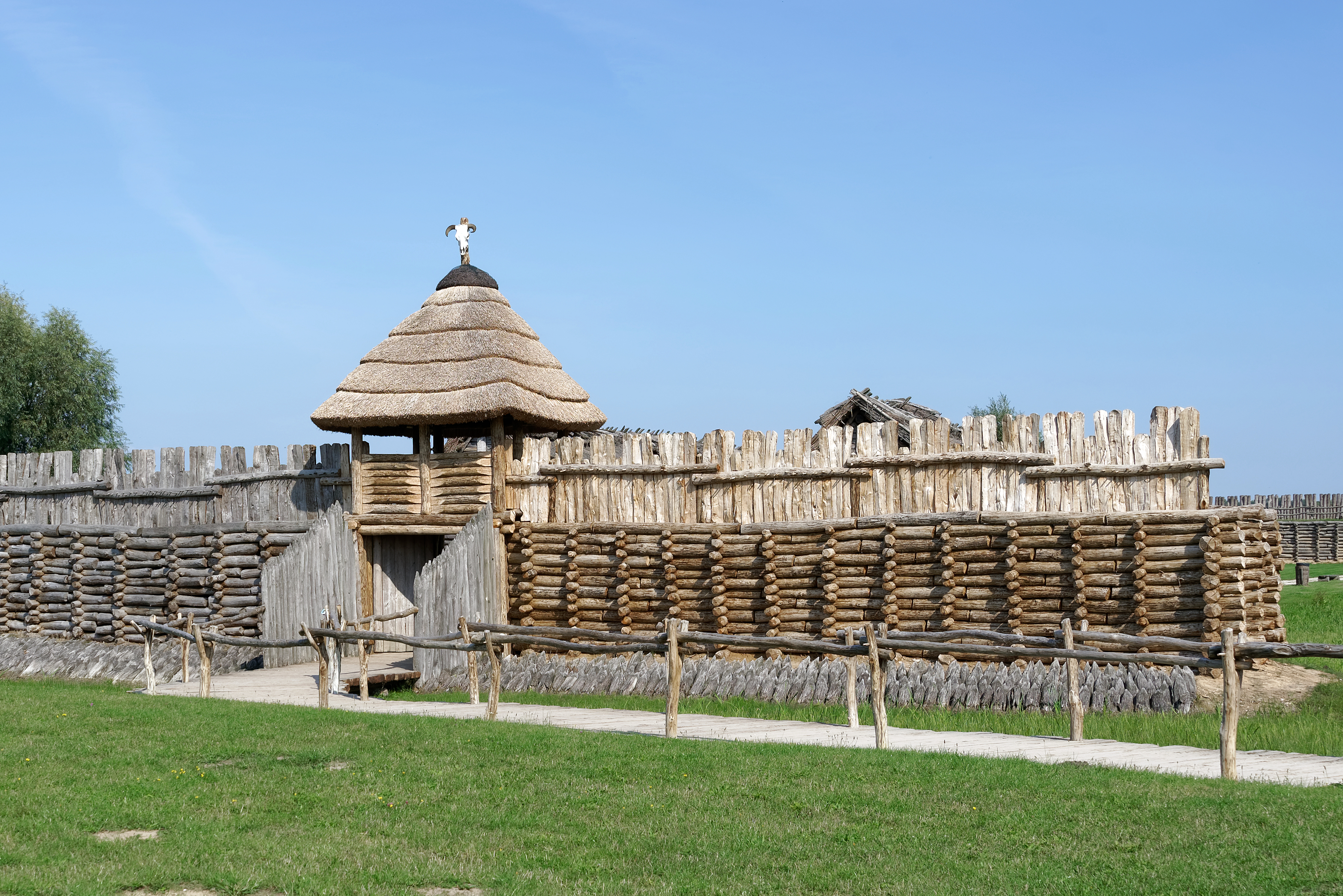
Biskupin

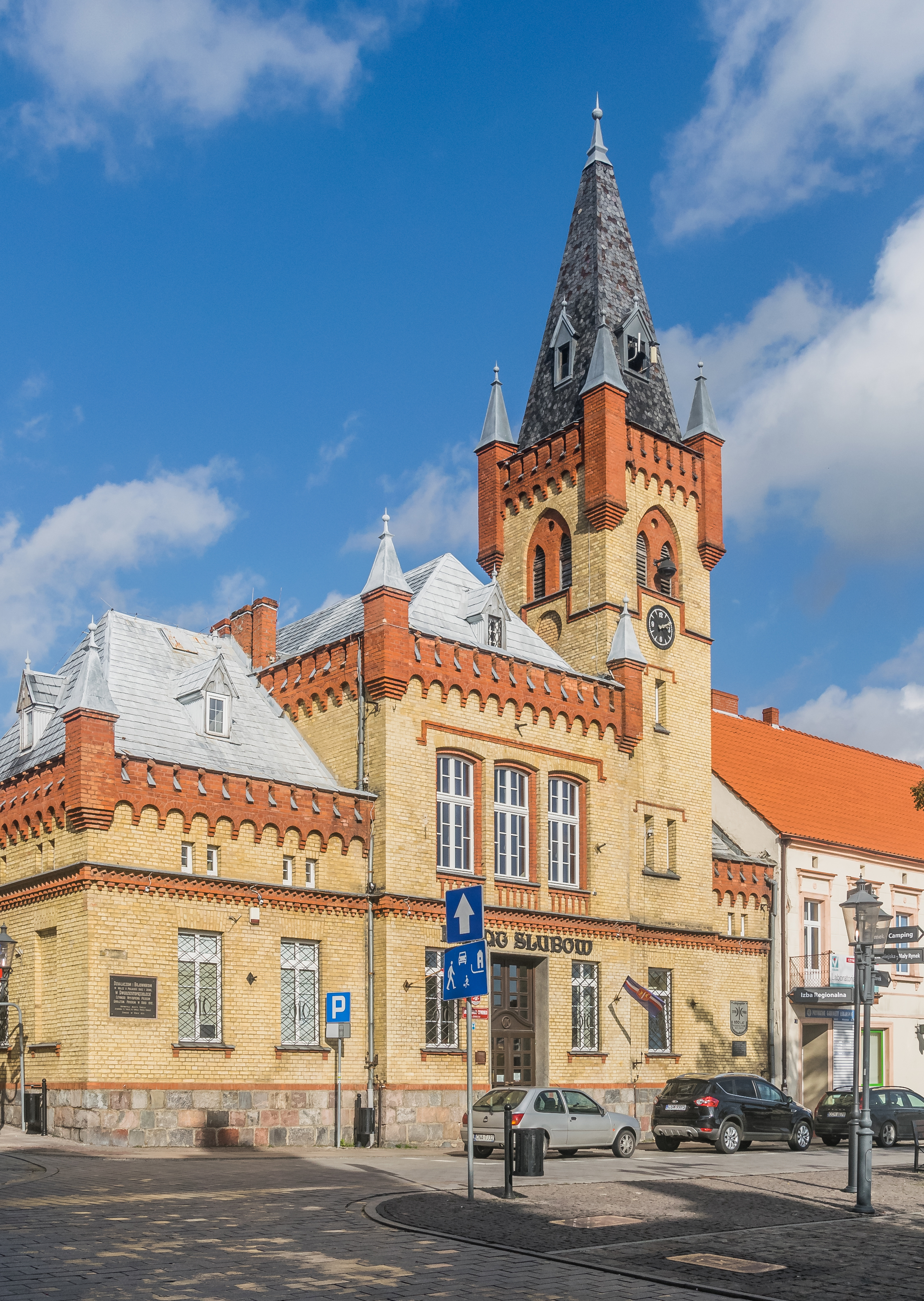
Town hall in Świecie

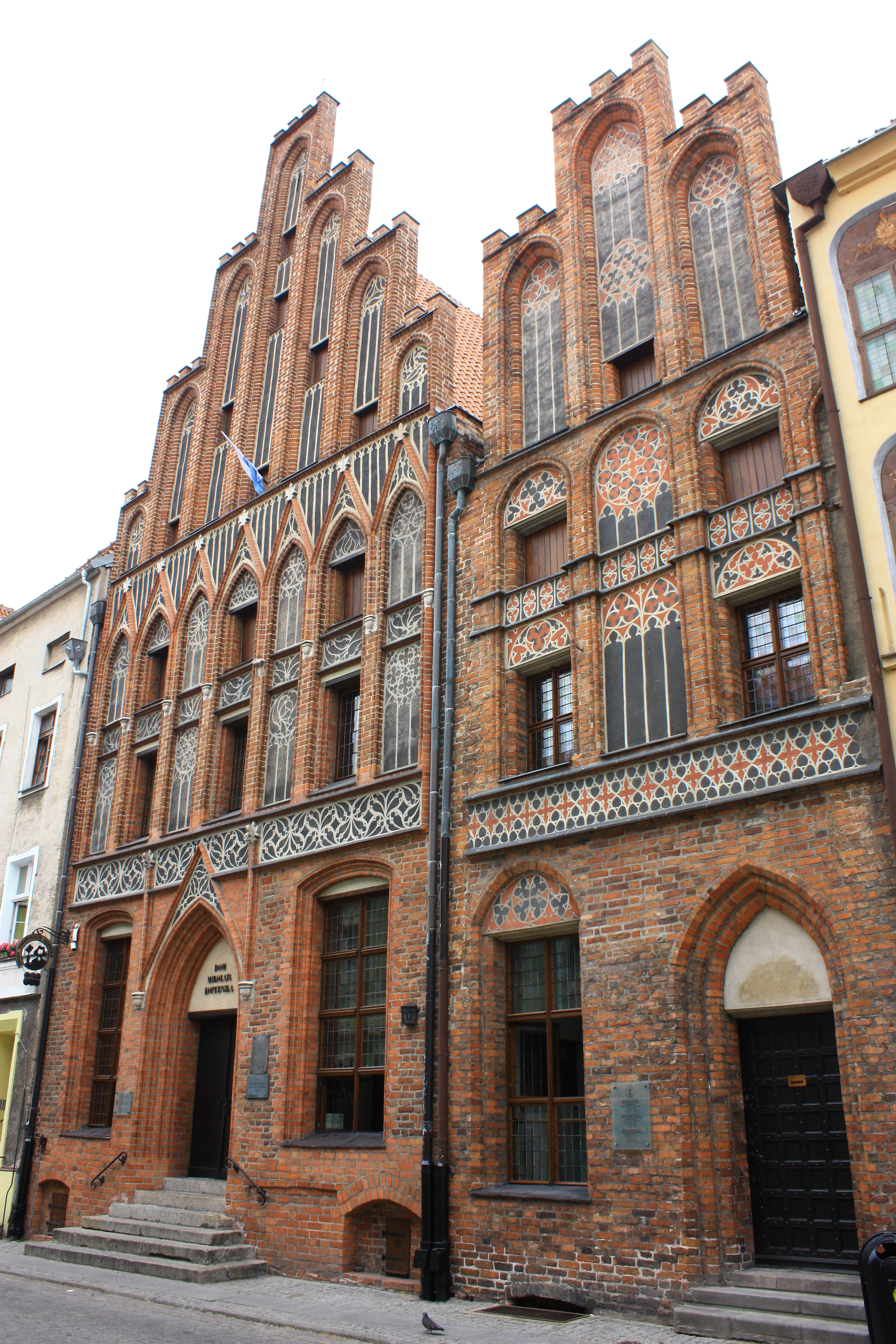
Nicolaus Copernicus House in Toruń

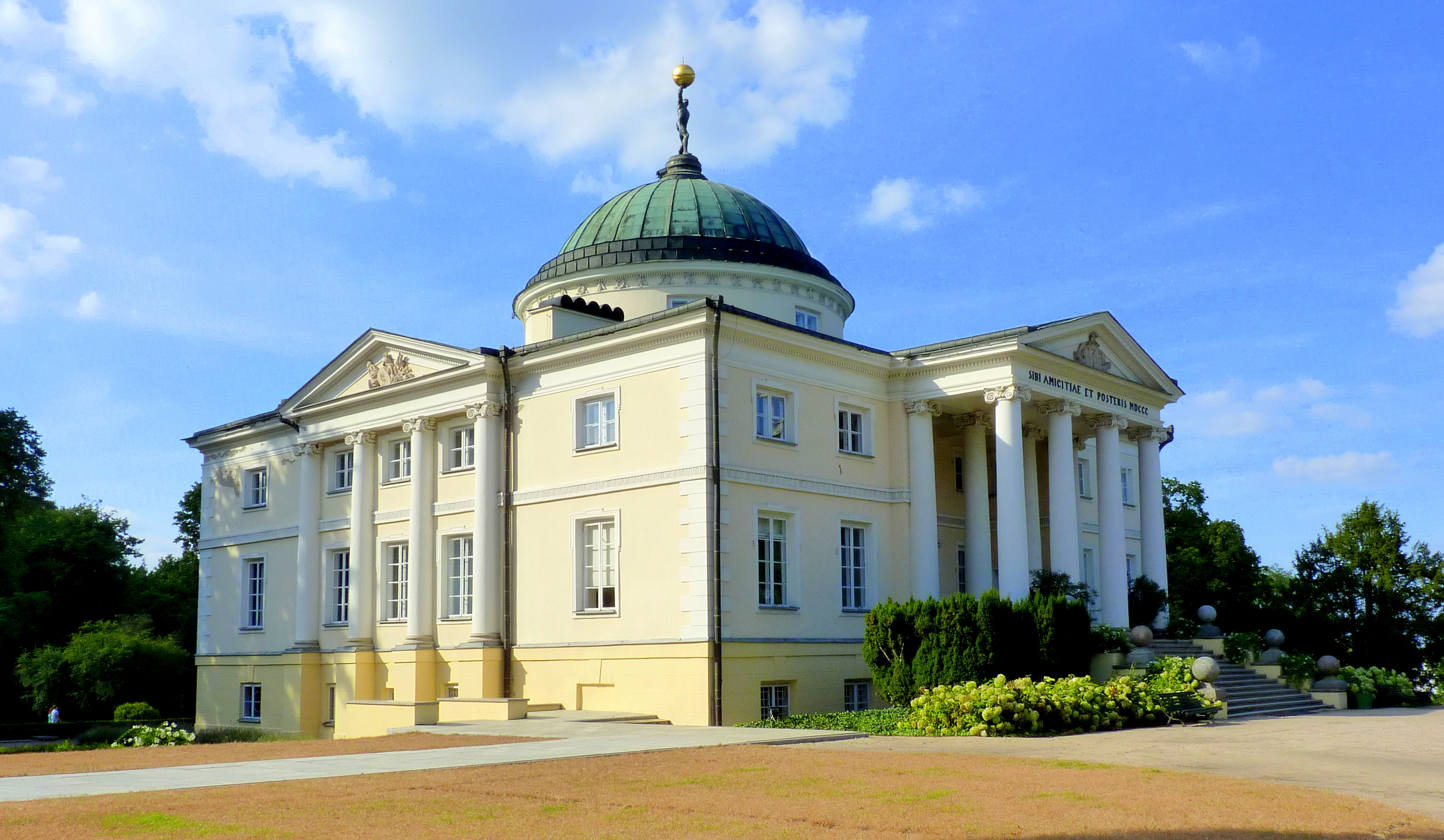
Lubostroń Palace

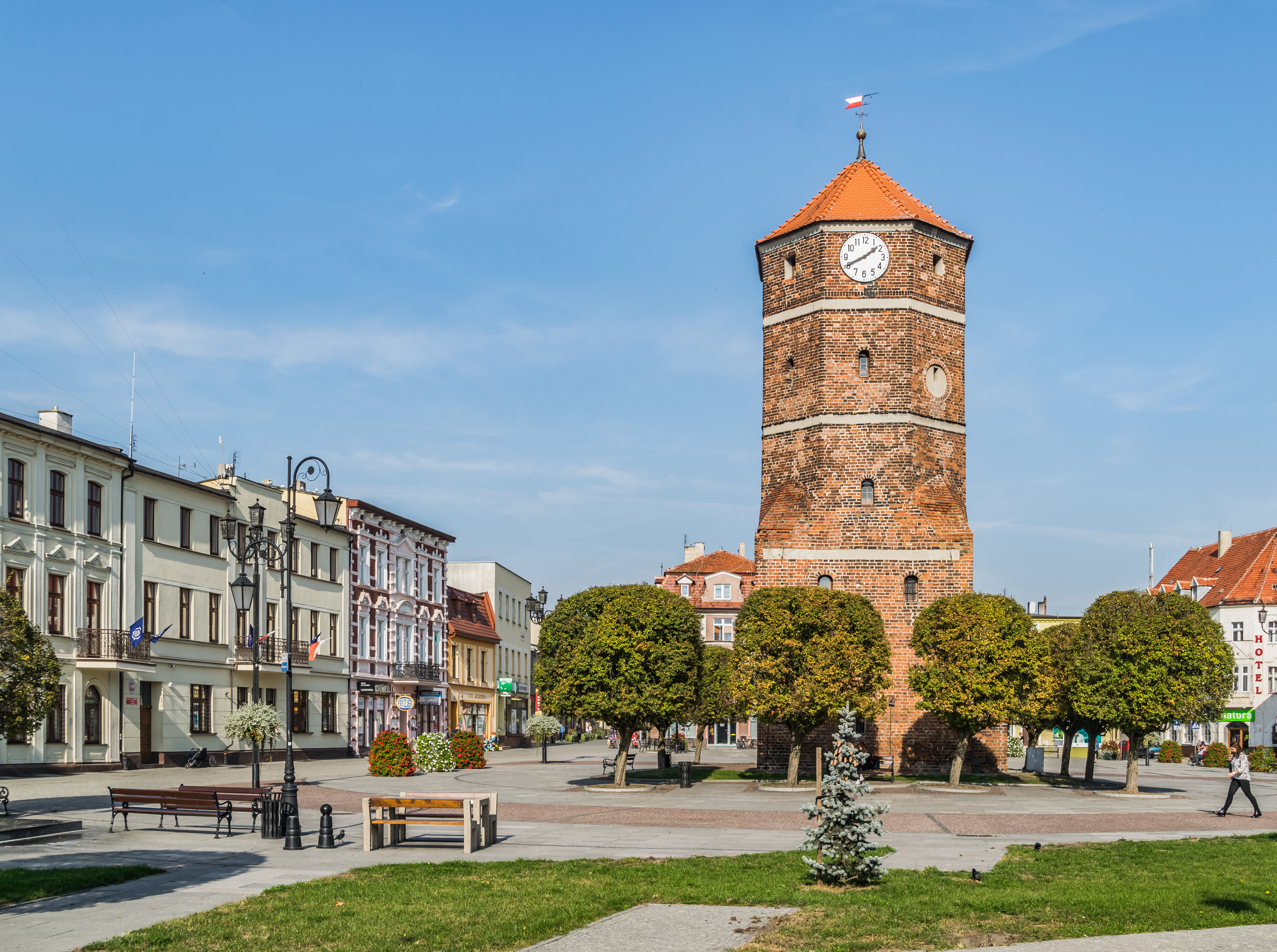
Market Square in Żnin

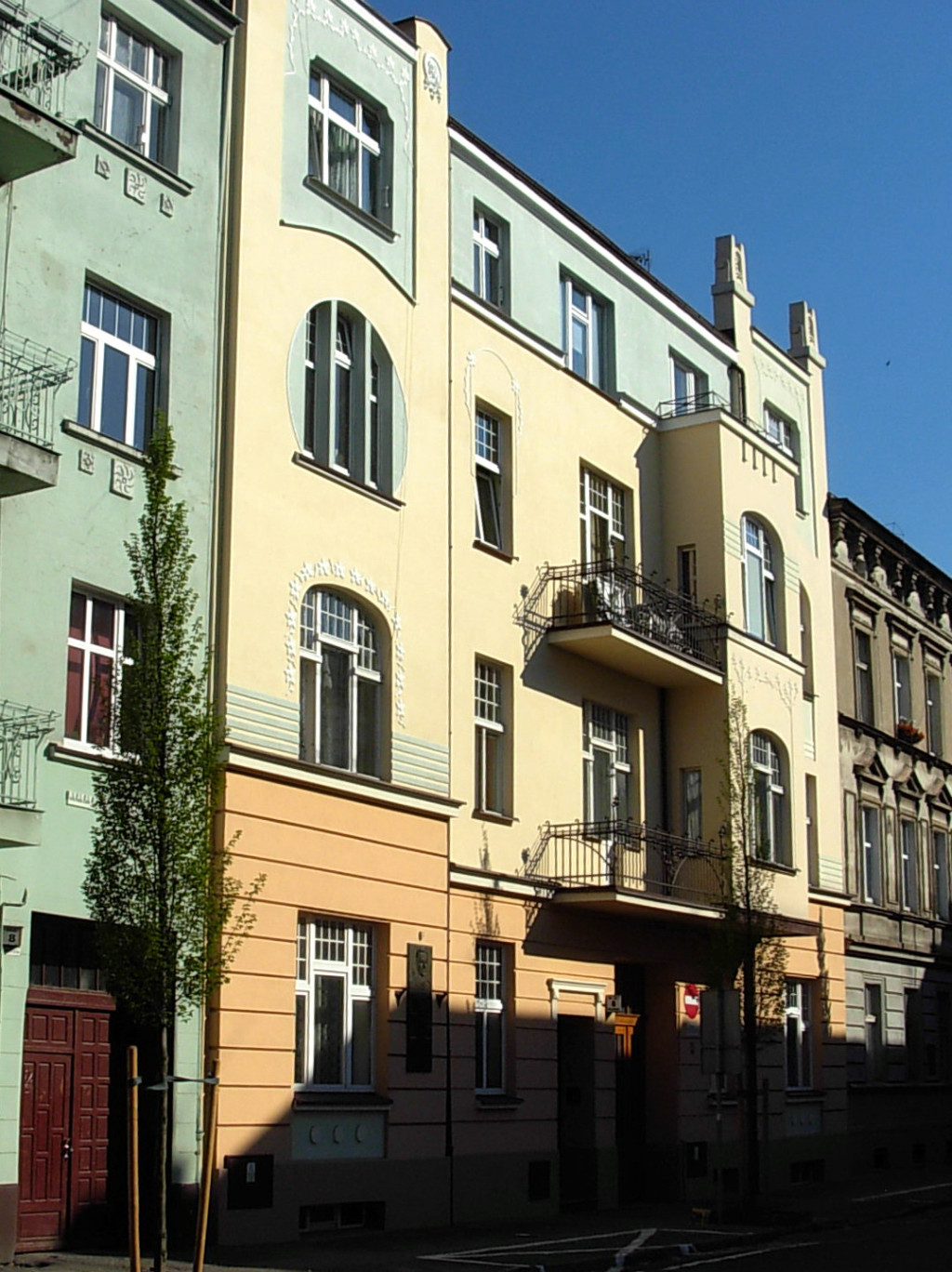
Birthplace of cryptologist Marian Rejewski in Bydgoszcz

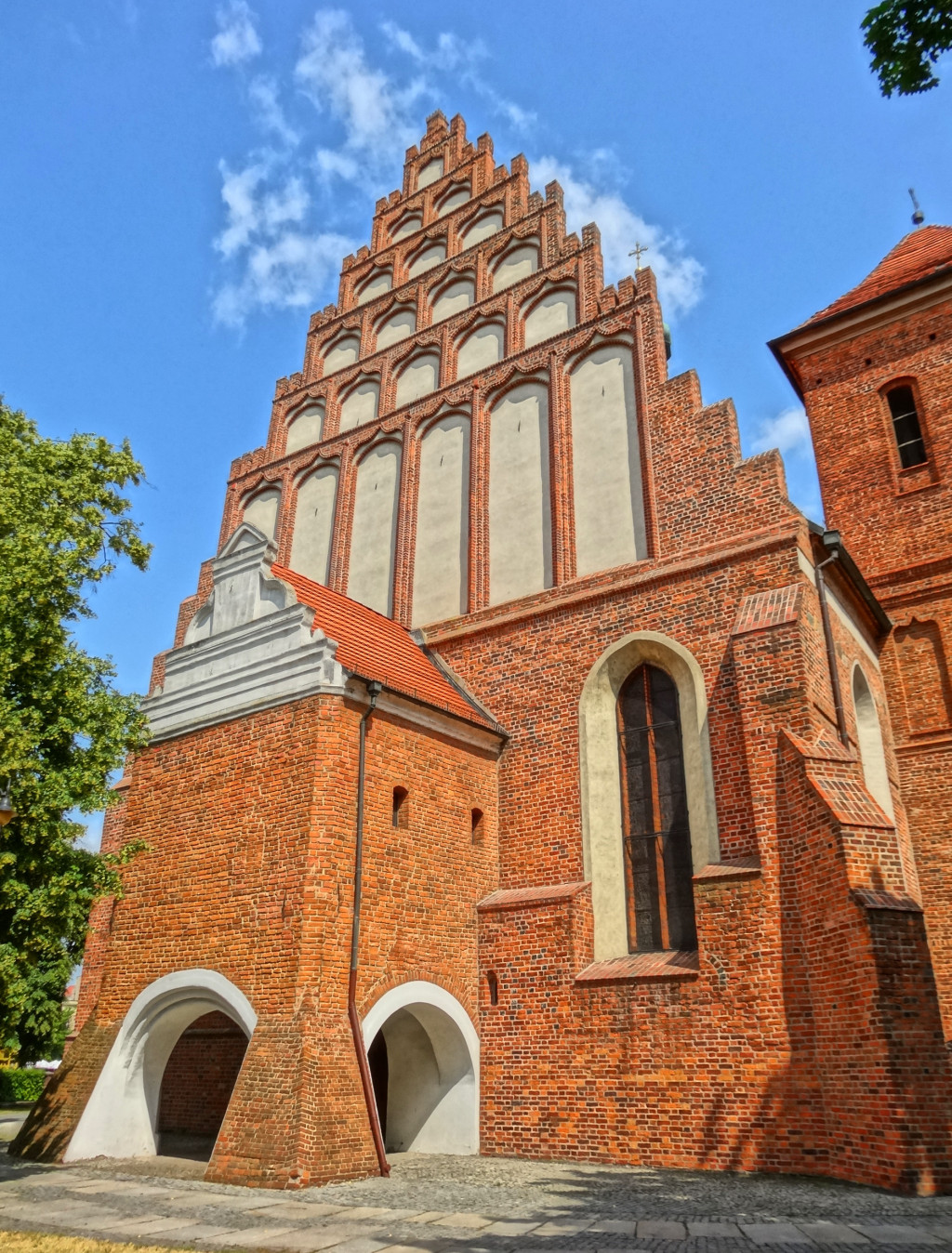
Bydgoszcz Cathedral

== See also ==
- Kuyavian-Pomeranian (European Parliament constituency)
