= Jadowniki Mokre =

- Village
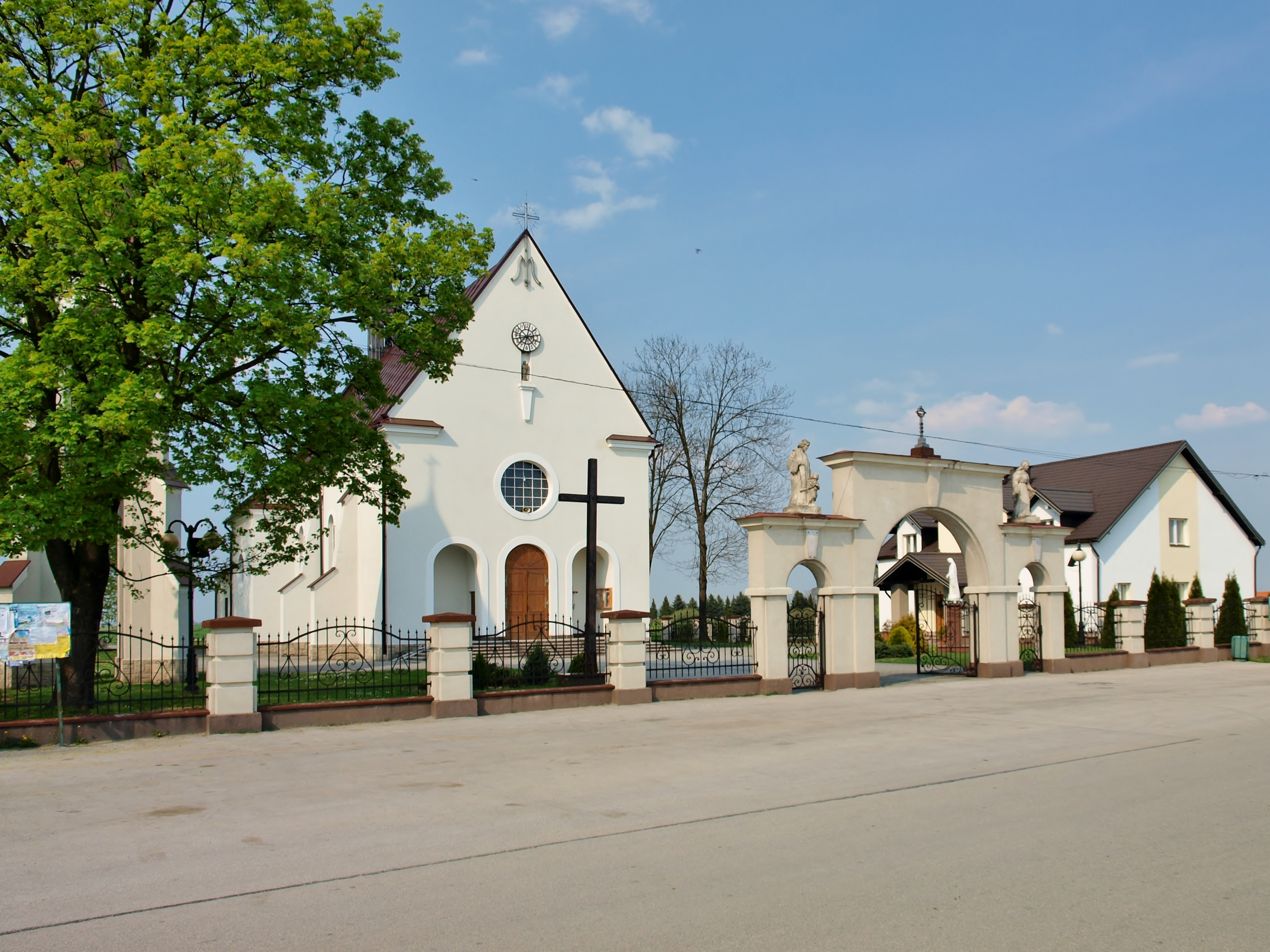
- Roman Catholic parish church of the Immaculate Heart of Blessed Virgin Mary

- Location within Poland
- Coordinates: 50°7′42″N 20°46′6″E
- Country: Poland
- Voivodeship: Lesser Poland
- County: Tarnów
- Gmina: Wietrzychowice
- Population: 860

Jadowniki Mokre is a village in Poland in Gmina Wietrzychowice, Tarnów County, Lesser Poland Voivodeship.

== Parts of the village ==
Integral parts of the village of Jadowniki Mokre
SIMC	Name	Type
1051695	Dębowe Domy	hamlet
1051749	Podborze	part of the village
1051784	Porębisko	part of the village
1051790	Rynek	part of the village
1051809	Rzadki Las	part of the village
1051844	Ulica	part of the village
1051873	Wyspa	part of the village

== History ==
The unwritten history of settlement in this area dates back to the Neolithic, as testified by archaeological discoveries confirming the presence of settlements from two thousand years ago.

In the 19th century, Jadowniki Mokre (with Zaurban) was described as a village between the Dunajec River and the mouth of the Uszwica River into the Vistula, in Brzesko County, Wietrzychowice parish, in the Równa area, with 976 Roman Catholic inhabitants.

In 1449, the owner of Jadowniki was Albert Czapka of the Nowina coat of arms . |Nowina]]. In 1476, the village passed into the hands of the Pieniążek family from Witkowice of the Jelita. In the 15th century, the village was owned by Stanisław Pieniążek of the Jelita coat of arms. Then it became the property of Feliks and Paulina Konopka. In 1880, Jadowniki Mokre belonged only to Jan Konopka. The larger estate owned by Konopka was distinguished by exemplary cultivation and has 330 morgas of land, 157 morgas of meadows and gardens, 23 morgas of pastures and 771 morgas of beautiful pine forest. The smaller estate (Zaurbanie) has 404 morgas of land, 362 morgas of meadows and gardens, 150 morgas of pastures. In 1944, the Operation Bridge (Wildhorn) action was carried out here. On May 4, 1944, the Gestapo and German gendarmerie detained 65 people in the village, and shot 12 of them. They also burned down 12 buildings.

== Monuments ==
Monuments entered in the Polish register of monuments of the Lesser Poland Voivodeship:

- Settlement from the period of Roman influence.

Other

- Plaque to commemorate those killed and murdered during World War Two in Poland.

== Religion ==
In Jadowniki Mokre there is a church called the Parish of the Immaculate Heart of the Blessed Virgin Mary and a care and rehabilitation center for children and youth run by Caritas.

== People associated with the town ==
- Józef Kowalczyk – the first Apostolic Nuncio to Poland, in the years 1989–2010, and Primate of Poland in the years 2010–2014.

== Gallery ==
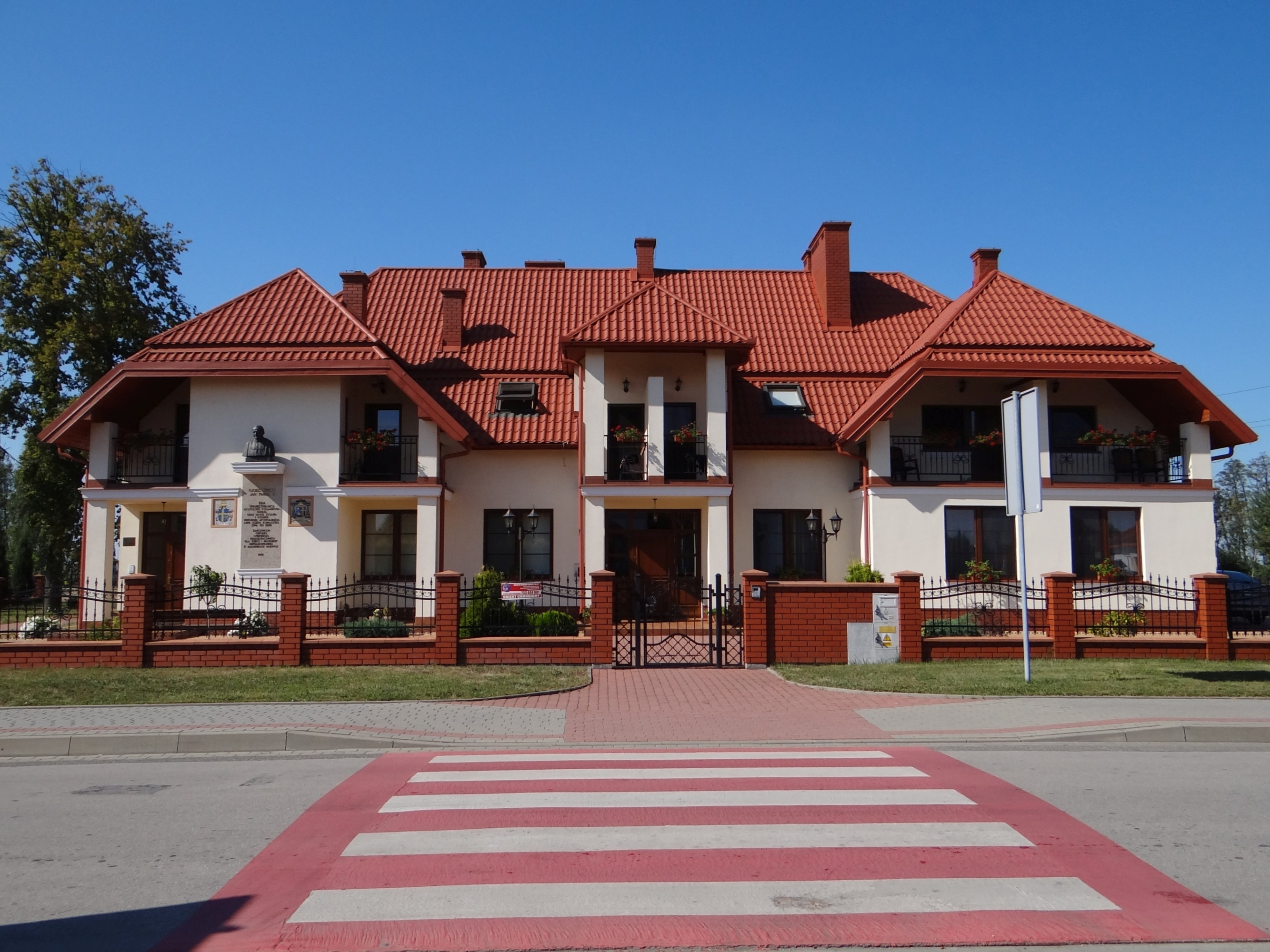

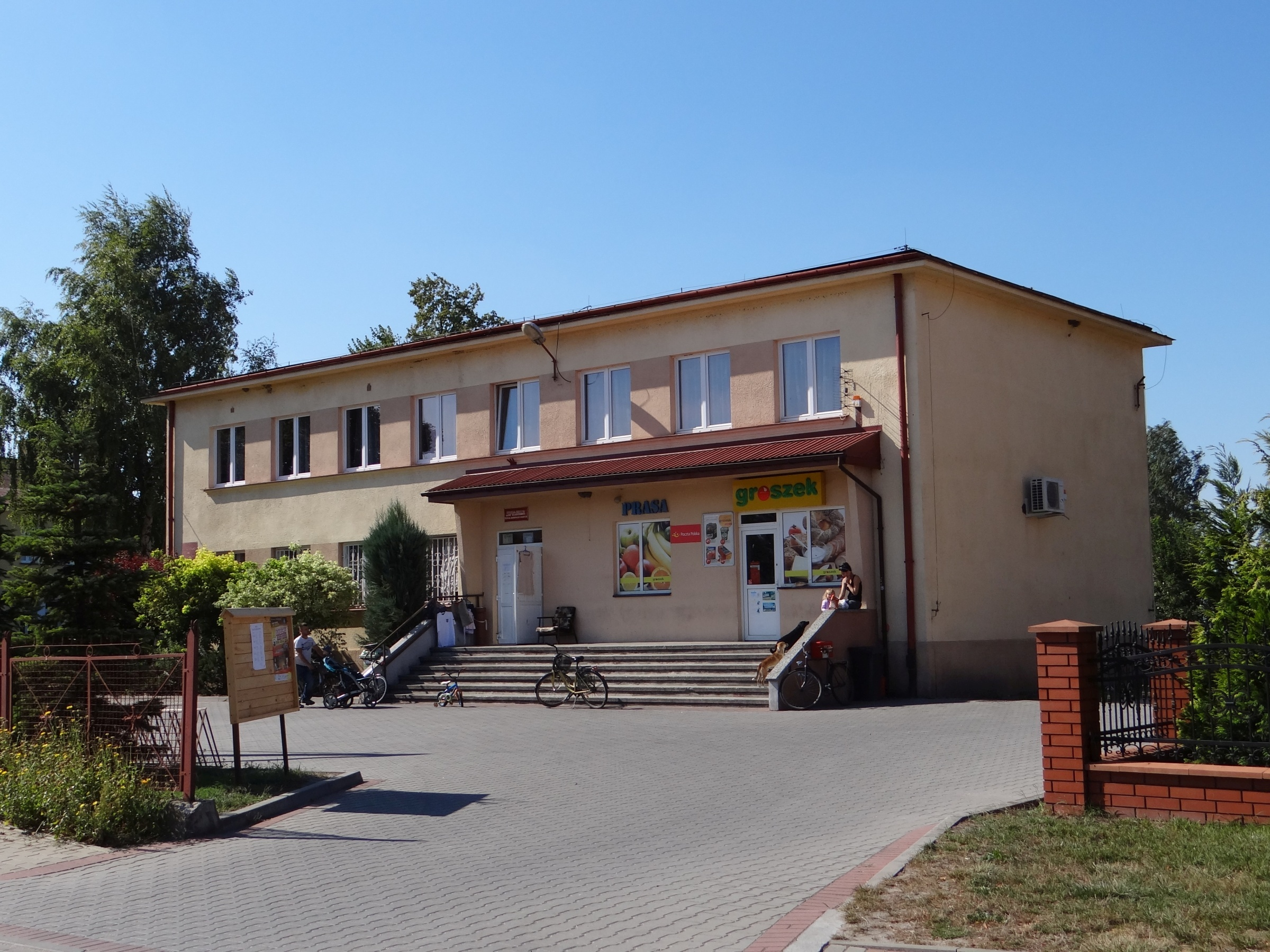

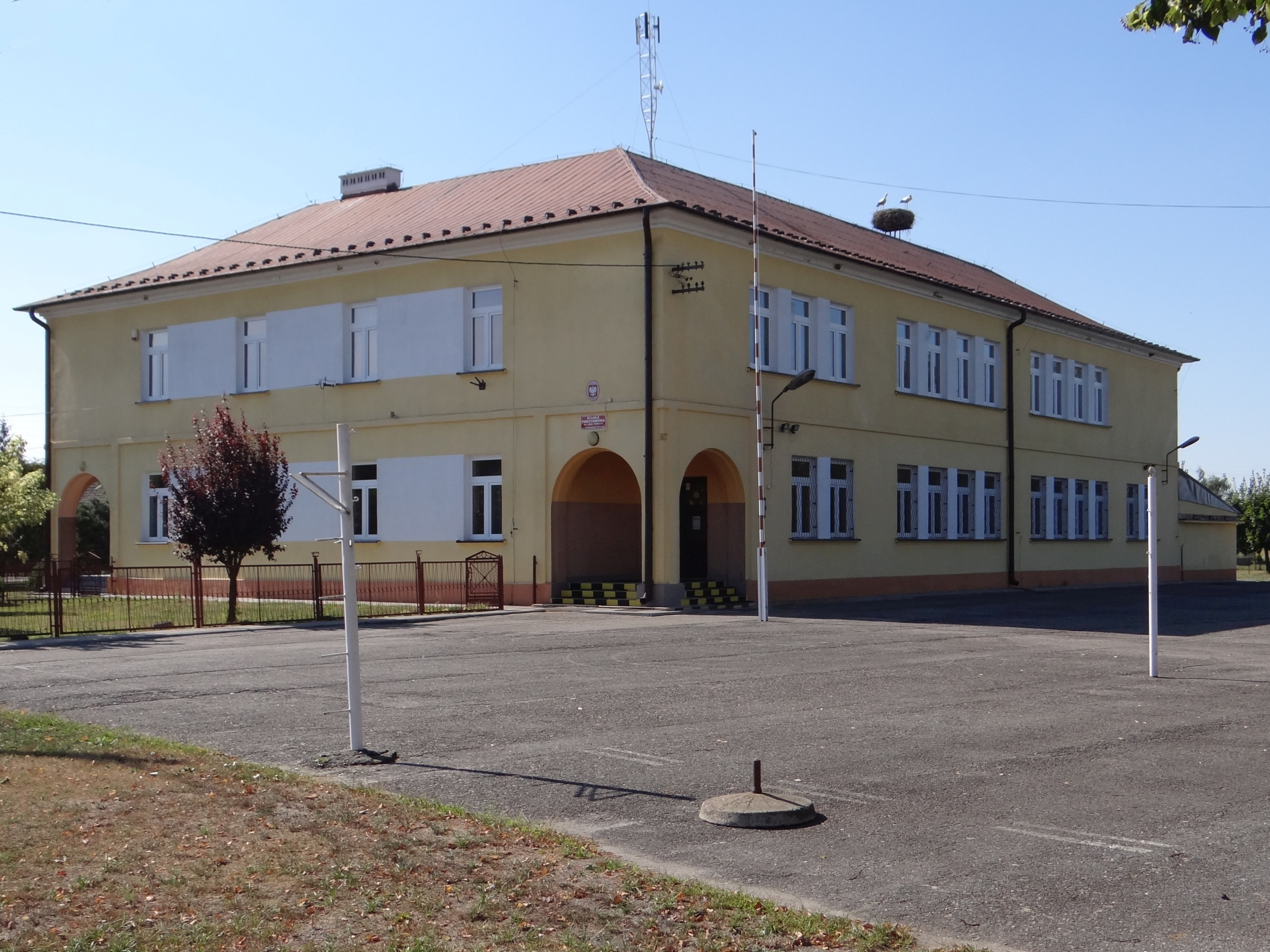

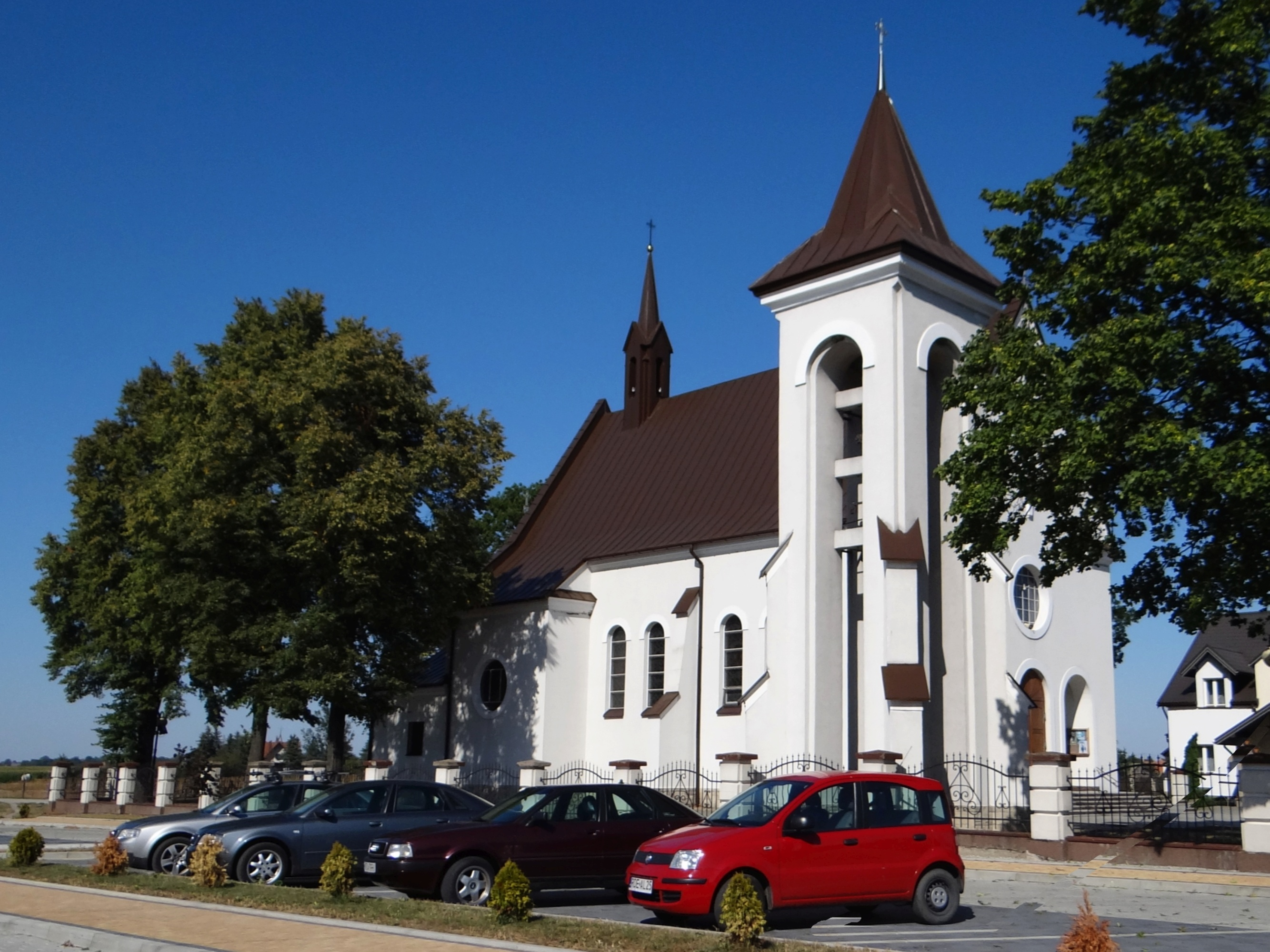

== See also ==
- Jadowniki
- Jadowniki Bielskie
- Jadowniki Rycerskie
