= Wilczkowo =

Wilczkowo may refer to the following places:

- Wilczkowo, Kuyavian-Pomeranian Voivodeship (north-central Poland)
- Wilczkowo, Masovian Voivodeship (east-central Poland)
- Wilczkowo, Warmian-Masurian Voivodeship (north Poland)
- Wilczkowo, West Pomeranian Voivodeship (north-west Poland)
- Wilczkowo, Świdwin County in West Pomeranian Voivodeship (north-west Poland)
