= Sarbinowo =

Sarbinowo may refer to the following places in Poland:

- Sarbinowo, Gostyń County in Greater Poland Voivodeship (west-central Poland)
- Sarbinowo, Poznań County in Greater Poland Voivodeship (west-central Poland)
- Sarbinowo, Kuyavian-Pomeranian Voivodeship (north-central Poland)
- Sarbinowo, Lubusz Voivodeship (west Poland)
- Sarbinowo, Gmina Dębno in West Pomeranian Voivodeship (north-west Poland)
- Sarbinowo, Koszalin County in West Pomeranian Voivodeship (north-west Poland), on the Baltic coast
