= Rakowo, Płock County =

Rakowo
- Village
- Location within Poland
- Coordinates: 52°23′41″N 20°04′32″E
- Country: Poland
- Voivodeship: Masovian
- County: Płock
- Gmina: Wyszogród

Rakowo [raˈkɔvɔ] is a village in the administrative district of Gmina Wyszogród, within Płock County, Masovian Voivodeship, in east-central Poland.

The village is laid out in an east–west line, between the Vistula River (to the south) and the Zakroczym-Płock road (to the north). It is west of the village of Drwały.

Rakowo was first mentioned in 1426. Olendrzy, German settlers, settled there at the end of the 18th century. In 1888, it had 25 houses, 311 residents and 711 morgens of land (including 107 morgens of wasteland). It also had a watermill. As is typical of Olender villages, the majority of homesteads are situated on man-made hillocks. Several examples of traditional buildings remain, as well as remnants of the Lutheran (Evangelical Augsbergian) cemetery.
