= Bożejewice =

Bożejewice may refer to either of two villages in Poland:

- Bożejewice, Mogilno County
- Bożejewice, Żnin County
