= Grażyna Wojcieszko =

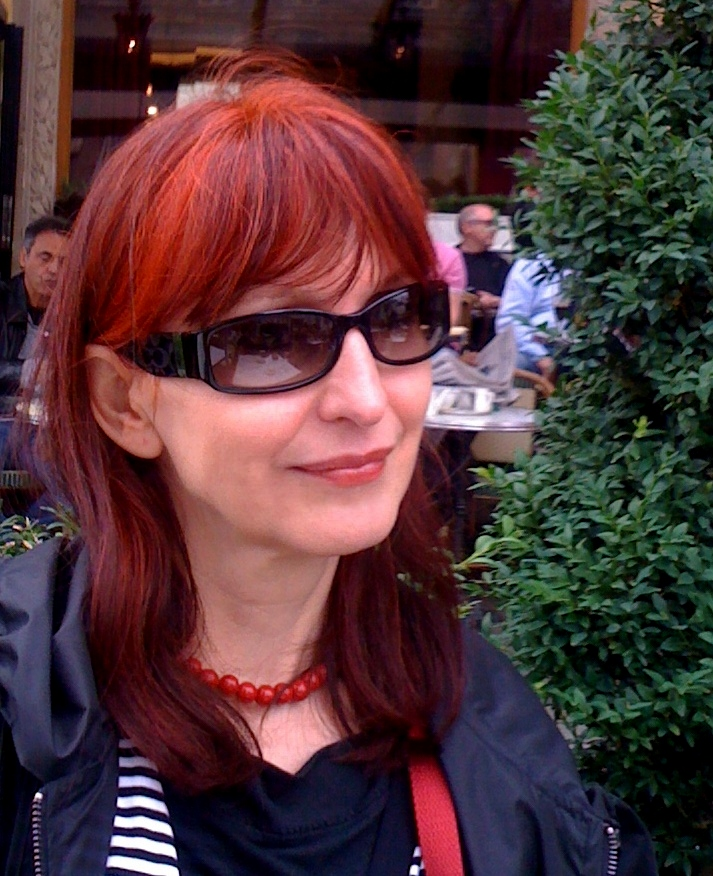
- Grazyna Wojcieszko
- Born: 14 September 1957; Bydgoszcz, Poland
- Citizenship: Polish
- Occupations: Poet, prose writer, essayist
- Website: grazynawojcieszko.eu#!__en

Grażyna Wojcieszko (born 14 September 1957 in Bydgoszcz, Poland) is a Polish poet and author of multiple collections. Her collection Les abattoirs de Bruxelles qualified for the Silesius 2008, and the collection was translated into French by Alain van Crugten, and published in 2011; poems were also translated into Swedish by Jurek Hirschberg and published in SueciaPolonia.

Wojcieszko has also taken part in several international poetry festivals; including Polish days at Saint Gilles in Brussels, Belgium in 2011, Poetry Spring in Luxembourg in 2012, 2011 Poetry Night in Chojnice, Poland, the 15th anniversary of the 'Artistic Literary Studies’ at the Jagiellonian University, Cracow, Poland, and the 5th and 6th edition of the Bydgoszcz Literary Triangle, Bydgoszcz, Poland.

She and musician Adam Prucnal created a poetry event, a mix of music and poetry, which they have performed globally.

== University diplomas ==
2005 Jagiellonian University Cracow, Poland, Faculty of Polish Studies, (Artistic Literary Studies); 1987 University Paris 6, France, (Artificial Intelligence); 1985 University Paris 11, France (Computer Science), 1981 Academy of Technology and Agriculture, Bydgoszcz, Poland (Telecommunication).

== Bibliography ==
- Mężczyzna w zielonych spodniach (Czerwona Papuga, Warszawa 2014), collective works, stories
- The tram dream (Księgarnia Akademicka, Kraków 2013), a collection
- Sen o tramwaju (Księgarnia Akademicka, Kraków 2013), audiobook
- Sen o tramwaju (Księgarnia Akademicka, Kraków 2012), a collection
- Poeci Borów Tucholskich (Miejska Biblioteka Publiczna w Tucholi, Tuchola 2012), collective works, poems
- Les abattoirs de Bruxelles (Księgarnia Akademicka, Kraków 2011) A collection
- Almanach IV Bronowickiego karnawału Literackiego (Klub Kultury Mydlniki, Kraków 2009), collective works, poems
- Rzeźnie Brukselskie(Księgarnia Akademicka, Kraków 2008), a collection
- Nie damy pogrześć mowy (Edition APAJTE, Paryż 2008), collective works, poems
- Miłość niejedno ma imię (Miejski Domu Kultury "Południe", 2007), collective works, poems
- Podróż Poetycka (EX LIBRIS 43bis, Katowice 2007), collective works, poems
- Cząstki języka (Miejska Biblioteka Publiczna, Nowa Ruda 2007), collective works, poems
- Karuzela (Księgarnia Akademicka, Kraków 2005), a collection
- Pretekst (Księgarnia Akademicka, Kraków 2005), collective works, poems
- W oczekiwaniu (Estrella, Warszawa 2000), a collection
