= Podgórzyn =

Podgórzyn may refer to the following places in Poland:

- Podgórzyn, Lower Silesian Voivodeship (south-west Poland)
- Podgórzyn, Kuyavian-Pomeranian Voivodeship (north-central Poland)
- Podgórzyn, Warmian-Masurian Voivodeship (north Poland)
