= Aloma of the South Seas =

Aloma of the South Seas may refer to:

- Aloma of the South Seas (play), a 1925 play by John B. Hymer and LeRoy Clemens
  - Aloma of the South Seas (1926 film), a 1926 silent film
  - Aloma of the South Seas (1941 film), a 1941 film nominated for two Academy Awards
