= Jędrzej Śniadecki =

Polish writer and physician (1768–1838)

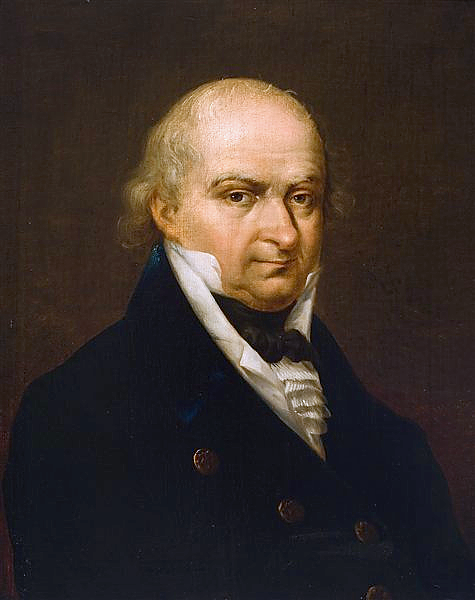
- 1843 painting by Aleksander Sleńdziński
- Born: 30 November 1768; Rydlewo, Polish–Lithuanian Commonwealth
- Died: 11 May 1838 (aged 69); Vilna, Russian Empire
- Resting place: Rossa Cemetery
- Occupations: Writer, physician, chemist, biologist
- Children: Ludwika Śniadecka (1802–1866)
- Relatives: Jan Śniadecki (brother)

Jędrzej Śniadecki (archaic Andrew Sniadecki; Lithuanian: Andrius Sniadeckis; 30 November 1768 – 11 May 1838) was a Polish writer (essayist and satirist), physician, chemist, biologist and philosopher. His achievements include being the first person who linked rickets to lack of sunlight. He also created modern Polish terminology in the field of chemistry.

== Life and work ==
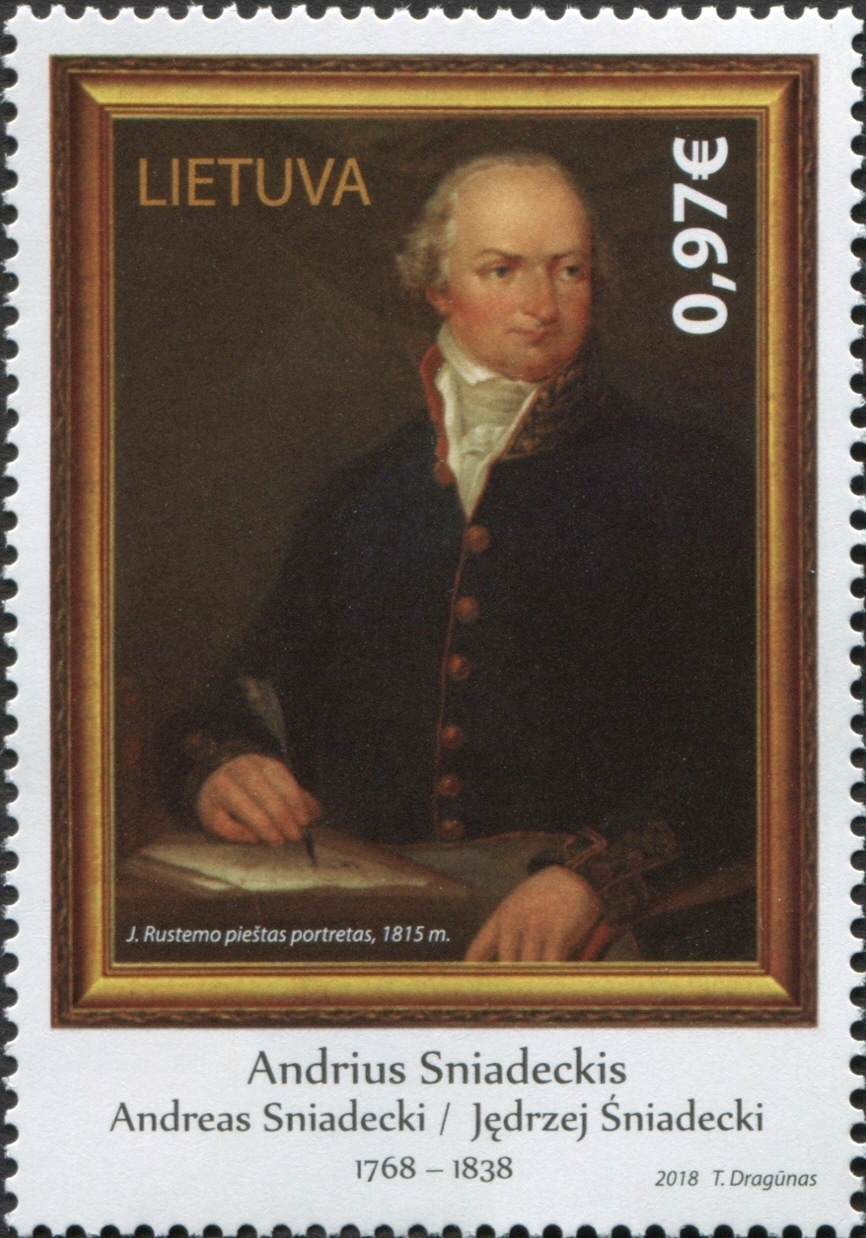
Śniadecki on a 2018 stamp of Lithuania

Śniadecki was born in Rydlewo, Żnin County (Greater Poland region) in the Polish–Lithuanian Commonwealth where his father Jędrzej and mother Franciszka née Giszczyński ran a farm. He went to a convent school in Trzemeszno and after the death of his father he was taken care of by paternal uncle Jan who was a professor at the Krakow Academy. He went to the Nowodworskie Gymnasium where he graduated with a gold medal for diligence which was presented at a ceremony by King Stanislaw. After briefly considering engineering (influenced by his brother Jan Śniadecki), he changed his mind and went to study medicine at the University of Krakow. His teachers included Wincenty Szaster and Jan Szaster. After completing his university studies at the Chief Crown School in Kraków, he resided for some time in Pavia, Italy and Scotland. He had been especially interested in the work of Galvani, Volta, Spallanzani and Antonio Scarpa. In Edinburgh he was influenced by John Duncan, James Gregory and Alexander Monro Secundus. In 1797, he was appointed to the Chair of Chemistry in the Medicine Faculty at the Main School in Vilnius (Wilno, Vilna), which in 1803 was renamed the Imperial University of Vilna. One of his students was Ignacy Domeyko. Śniadecki was also one of the main organizers, along with Johann Peter Frank, and head of the recently created Wilno Medical-Surgical Academy. In 1806–1836 he headed the local Medical Scientific Society, one of the premier scientific societies in the region. In 1830 his wife and brother Jan died.

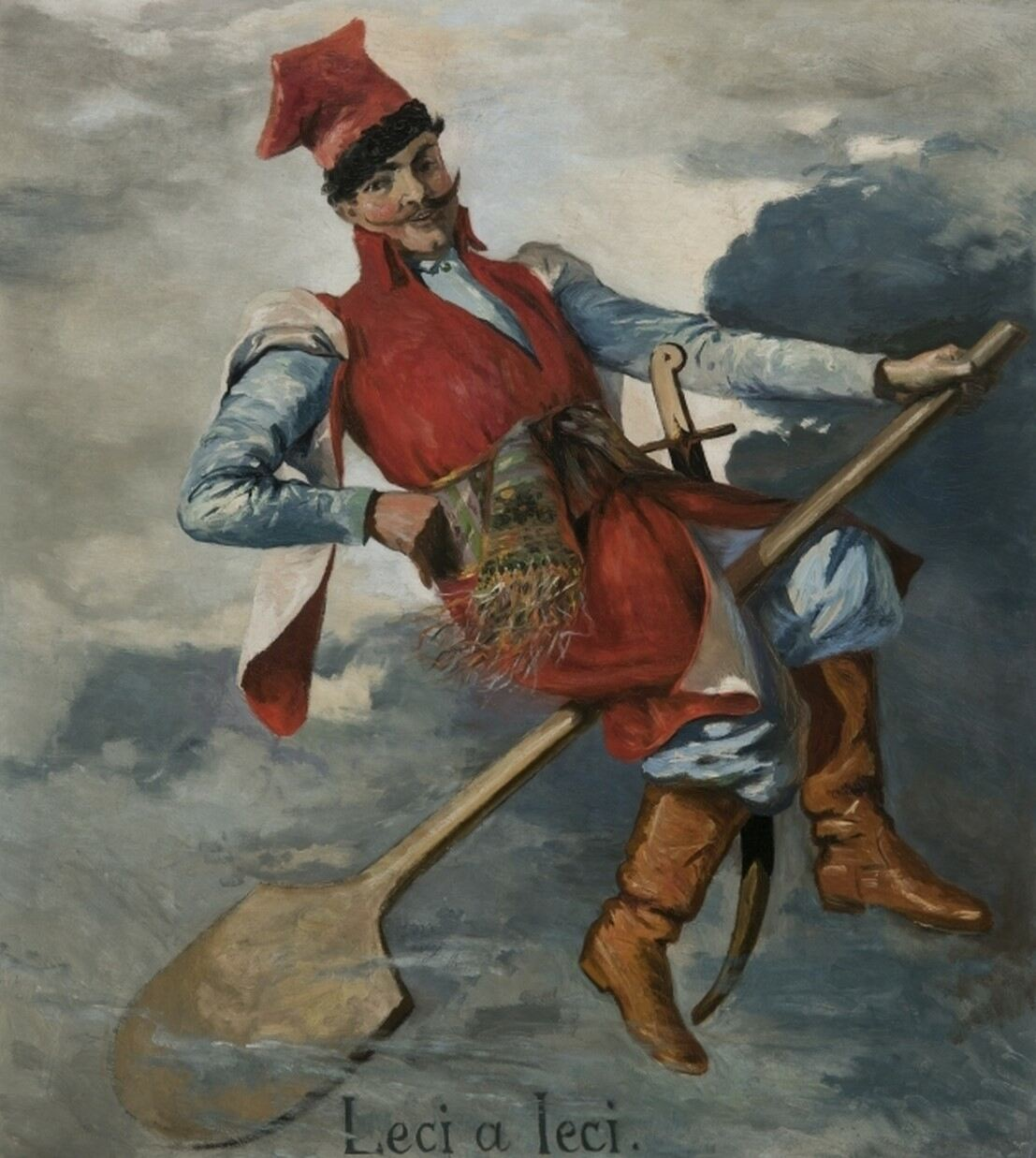
"Szlachcic na łopacie" ("Nobleman on a spade") was a pen name of Śniadecki as a humorist

Śniadecki's most important book was Początki chemii (The Beginnings of Chemistry), the first Polish-language chemistry textbook, prepared for the Commission of National Education. It was considered one of the best Polish scientific textbooks of the age and was used in Polish universities well into the 1930s. Śniadecki was also known as a writer of less serious works; a co-founder of Towarzystwo Szubrawców (The Wastrel Society), he contributed articles to its satirical weekly, Wiadomości Brukowe (The Pavement News). He also wrote copiously in Wiadomości Wileńskie (The Vilnius' News), the largest and most prestigious daily in Vilnius.

In 1807, Śniadecki announced he had discovered a new metal in platinum and called it "vestium". Three years later, Académie de France published a note saying that the experiment could not be reproduced. Discouraged by this, Śniadecki dropped all his claims and did not talk about vestium anymore. Nevertheless, there have been speculations that this new element was ruthenium, found 37 years later by Karl Klaus. However, they are not accepted by modern sources.

Jędrzej was the father of Ludwika Śniadecka. He died in Vilnius and is buried at the Horodnyki Cemetery in Ashmyany district in Belarus.
