= Kaczkowo =

Kaczkowo may refer to the following places:

- Kaczkowo, Greater Poland Voivodeship (west-central Poland)
- Kaczkowo, Inowrocław County in Kuyavian-Pomeranian Voivodeship (north-central Poland)
- Kaczkowo, Żnin County in Kuyavian-Pomeranian Voivodeship (north-central Poland)
- Kaczkowo, Pomeranian Voivodeship (north Poland)
