= Ciućkowo =

- Village
- Location within Poland
- Coordinates: 52°26′N 20°7′E
- Country: Poland
- Voivodeship: Masovian
- County: Płock
- Gmina: Wyszogród

Ciućkowo [t͡ɕut͡ɕˈkɔvɔ] is a village in the administrative district of Gmina Wyszogród, within Płock County, Masovian Voivodeship, in east-central Poland.
