= Gmina Żnin =

Gmina Żnin Żnin Commune
- Gmina
- Flag Coat of arms
- Interactive map of Gmina Żnin
- Coordinates (Żnin): 52°51′N 17°42′E
- Country: Poland
- Voivodeship: Kuyavian-Pomeranian
- County: Żnin
- Seat: Żnin

Area
  - Total: 251.55 km^{2} (97.12 sq mi)

Population (2006)
  - Total: 24,089
  - Density: 95.762/km^{2} (248.02/sq mi)
  - Urban: 14,052
  - Rural: 10,037

Gmina Żnin is an urban-rural gmina (administrative district) in Żnin County, Kuyavian-Pomeranian Voivodeship, in north-central Poland. Its seat is the town of Żnin, which lies approximately 36 kilometres (22 mi) south-west of Bydgoszcz.

The gmina covers an area of 251.55 square kilometres (97.1 sq mi), and as of 2006 its total population is 24,089 (out of which the population of Żnin amounts to 14,052, and the population of the rural part of the gmina is 10,037).

== Villages ==
Apart from the town of Żnin, Gmina Żnin contains the villages and settlements of:

- Bekanówka
- Białożewin
- Bożejewice
- Bożejewiczki
- Brzyskorzystew
- Brzyskorzystewko
- Cerekwica
- Chomiąża Księża
- Chomiąża Księża-Leśniczówka
- Daronice
- Dobrylewo
- Dochanowo
- Gorzyce
- Jadowniki Bielskie
- Jadowniki Rycerskie
- Januszkowo
- Jaroszewo
- Kaczkówko
- Kaczkowo
- Kępa
- Kierzkowo
- Murczyn
- Murczynek
- Nadborowo
- Nowiny
- Nowiny-Leśniczówka
- Obrona Leśna
- Paryż
- Podgórzyn
- Podobowice
- Probostwo
- Redczyce
- Rydlewo
- Sarbinowo
- Sielec
- Skarbienice
- Słabomierz
- Sławoszewo
- Słębowo
- Sobiejuchy
- Sulinowo
- Świerczewo
- Uścikowo
- Ustaszewo
- Wawrzynki
- Wenecja
- Wilczkowo
- Wójcin
- Żnin-Wieś

== Neighbouring gminas ==
Gmina Żnin is bordered by the gminas of Barcin, Dąbrowa, Damasławek, Gąsawa, Janowiec Wielkopolski, Kcynia, Łabiszyn, Rogowo, Szubin and Wapno.
