= Uścikowo, Kuyavian-Pomeranian Voivodeship =

Uścikowo
- Village
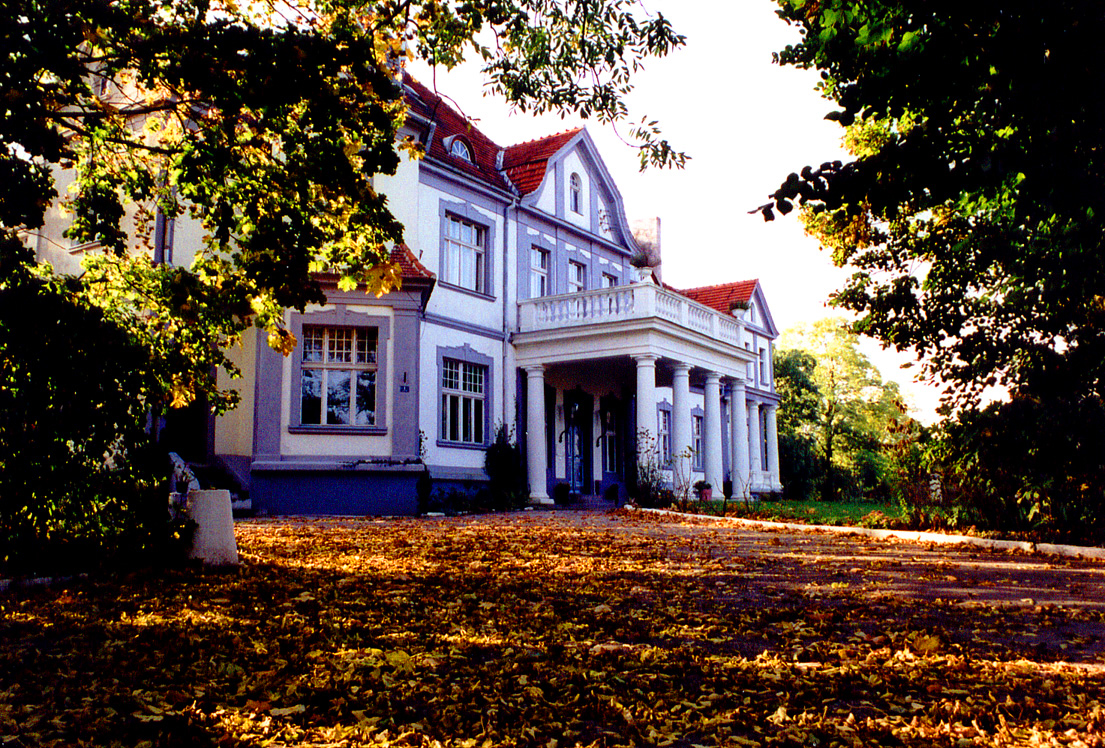

- Location within Poland
- Coordinates: 52°49′06″N 17°35′36″E
- Country: Poland
- Voivodeship: Kuyavian-Pomeranian
- County: Żnin
- Gmina: Żnin

Uścikowo [uɕt͡ɕiˈkɔvɔ] is a village in the administrative district of Gmina Żnin, within Żnin County, Kuyavian-Pomeranian Voivodeship, in north-central Poland.
