= Kaczkówko =

- Village
- Location within Poland
- Coordinates: 52°48′7″N 17°38′20″E
- Country: Poland
- Voivodeship: Kuyavian-Pomeranian
- County: Żnin
- Gmina: Żnin
- Population: 140

Kaczkówko [kat͡ʂˈkufkɔ] is a village in the administrative district of Gmina Żnin, within Żnin County, Kuyavian-Pomeranian Voivodeship, in north-central Poland.
