= Bielice, Płock County =

Bielice
- Village
- Location within Poland
- Coordinates: 52°27′20″N 20°13′1″E
- Country: Poland
- Voivodeship: Masovian
- County: Płock
- Gmina: Wyszogród
- Population: 70

Bielice [bjɛˈlit͡sɛ] is a village in the administrative district of Gmina Wyszogród, within Płock County, Masovian Voivodeship, in east-central Poland.
