= Starzyno, Masovian Voivodeship =

Starzyno
- Village
- Location within Poland
- Coordinates: 52°24′16″N 20°05′12″E
- Country: Poland
- Voivodeship: Masovian
- County: Płock
- Gmina: Wyszogród

Starzyno [staˈʐɨnɔ] is a village in the administrative district of Gmina Wyszogród, within Płock County, Masovian Voivodeship, in east-central Poland.
