= Rostkowice, Masovian Voivodeship =

Rostkowice
- Village
- Location within Poland
- Coordinates: 52°27′34″N 20°12′29″E
- Country: Poland
- Voivodeship: Masovian
- County: Płock
- Gmina: Wyszogród

Rostkowice [rɔstkɔˈvit͡sɛ] is a village in the administrative district of Gmina Wyszogród, within Płock County, Masovian Voivodeship, in east-central Poland.
