= Cerekwica, Kuyavian-Pomeranian Voivodeship =

Cerekwica
- Village
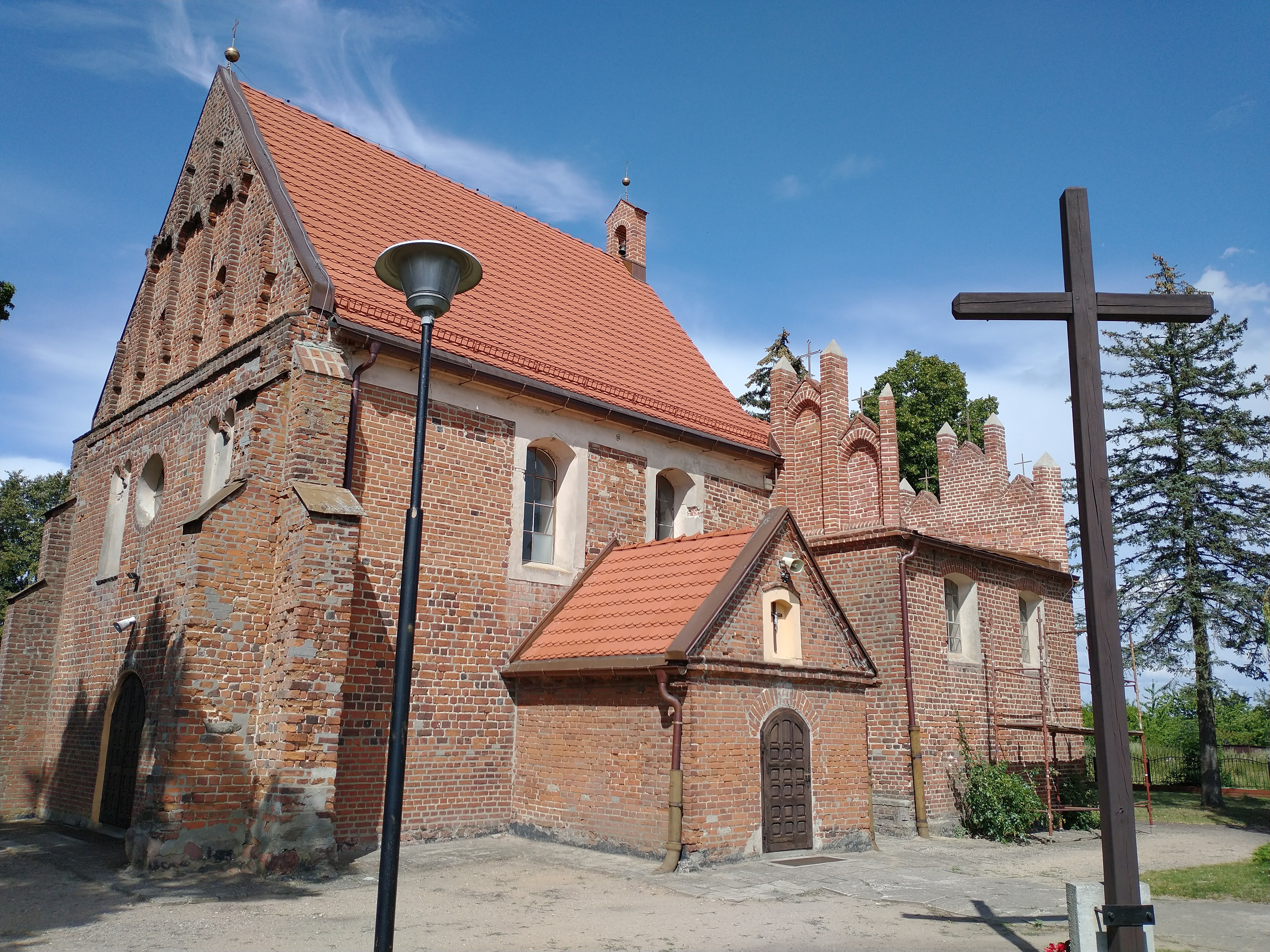
- Medieval Saint Nicholas church in Cerekwica

- Location within Poland
- Coordinates: 52°50′N 17°38′E
- Country: Poland
- Voivodeship: Kuyavian-Pomeranian
- County: Żnin
- Gmina: Żnin

Population
  - Total: 900
- Postal code: 88-400
- Vehicle registration: CZN

Cerekwica [t͡sɛrɛkˈfit͡sa] is a village in the administrative district of Gmina Żnin, within Żnin County, Kuyavian-Pomeranian Voivodeship, in central Poland.
