= Gmina Wyszogród =

Gmina Wyszogród Wyszogród Commune
- Gmina
- Coat of arms
- Interactive map of Gmina Wyszogród
- Coordinates (Wyszogród): 52°23′N 20°12′E
- Country: Poland
- Voivodeship: Masovian
- County: Płock County
- Seat: Wyszogród

Area
  - Total: 97.93 km^{2} (37.81 sq mi)

Population (2006)
  - Total: 6,002
  - Density: 61.29/km^{2} (158.7/sq mi)
  - Urban: 2,772
  - Rural: 3,230
- Time zone: UTC+1 (CET)
  - Summer (DST): UTC+2 (CEST)
- Vehicle registration: WPL
- Website: http://www.wyszogrod.pl

Gmina Wyszogród is an urban-rural gmina (administrative district) in Płock County, Masovian Voivodeship, in central Poland. Its seat is the town of Wyszogród, which lies approximately 39 kilometres (24 mi) south-east of Płock and 58 km (36 mi) west of Warsaw.

The gmina covers an area of 97.93 square kilometres (37.8 sq mi), and as of 2006 its total population is 6,002 (out of which the population of Wyszogród amounts to 2,772, and the population of the rural part of the gmina is 3,230).

== Villages ==
Apart from the town of Wyszogród, Gmina Wyszogród contains the villages and settlements of Bielice, Bolino, Chmielewo, Ciućkowo, Drwały, Gródkówko, Grodkowo, Kobylniki, Marcjanka, Pozarzyn, Pruszczyn, Rakowo, Rębowo, Rostkowice, Słomin, Starzyno, Wiązówka and Wilczkowo.

== Neighbouring gminas ==
Gmina Wyszogród is bordered by the gminas of Brochów, Czerwińsk nad Wisłą, Iłów, Mała Wieś, Młodzieszyn and Naruszewo.
