= Białożewin =

- Village
- Location within Poland
- Coordinates: 52°49′48″N 17°47′20″E
- Country: Poland
- Voivodeship: Kuyavian-Pomeranian
- County: Żnin
- Gmina: Żnin

Białożewin [bjawɔˈʐɛvin] is a village in the administrative district of Gmina Żnin, within Żnin County, Kuyavian-Pomeranian Voivodeship, in north-central Poland.
