= Kobylniki, Masovian Voivodeship =

Kobylniki
- Village
- Location within Poland
- Coordinates: 52°28′N 20°14′E
- Country: Poland
- Voivodeship: Masovian
- County: Płock
- Gmina: Wyszogród

Kobylniki [kɔbɨlˈniki] is a village in the administrative district of Gmina Wyszogród, within Płock County, Masovian Voivodeship, in east-central Poland.
