= Sobiejuchy =

- Village
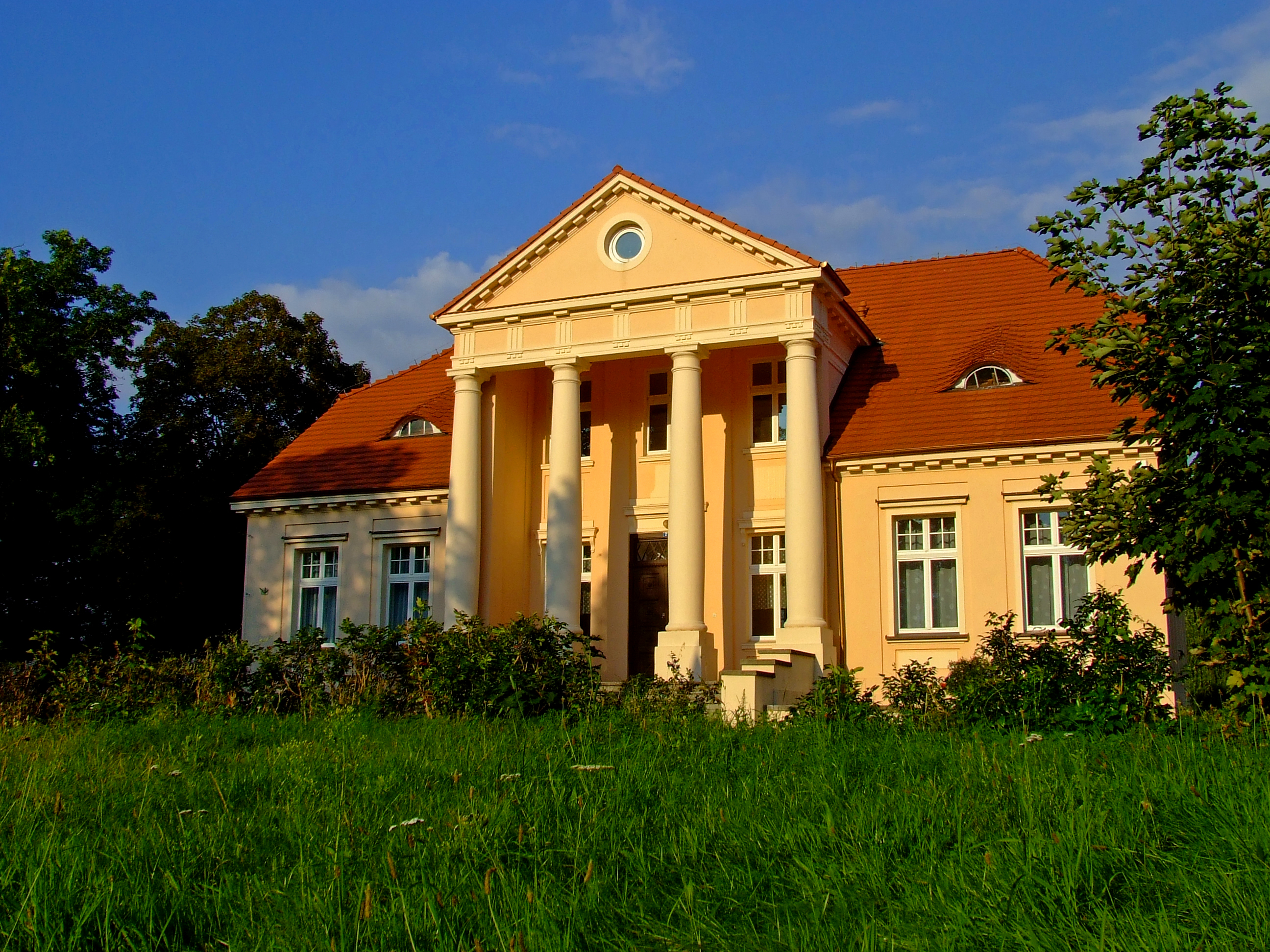
- Historic manor in Sobiejuchy

- Location within Poland
- Coordinates: 52°54′N 17°43′E
- Country: Poland
- Voivodeship: Kuyavian-Pomeranian
- County: Żnin
- Gmina: Żnin
- Time zone: UTC+1 (CET)
  - Summer (DST): UTC+2 (CEST)
- Vehicle registration: CZN

Sobiejuchy [sɔbjɛˈjuxɨ] is a village in the administrative district of Gmina Żnin, within Żnin County, Kuyavian-Pomeranian Voivodeship, in north-central Poland.
