= Marcjanka, Masovian Voivodeship =

Marcjanka
- Village
- Location within Poland
- Coordinates: 52°24′N 20°7′E
- Country: Poland
- Voivodeship: Masovian
- County: Płock
- Gmina: Wyszogród

Marcjanka [mart͡sˈjaŋka] is a village in the administrative district of Gmina Wyszogród, within Płock County, Masovian Voivodeship, in east-central Poland.
