= Cabaret (1927 film) =

1927 film

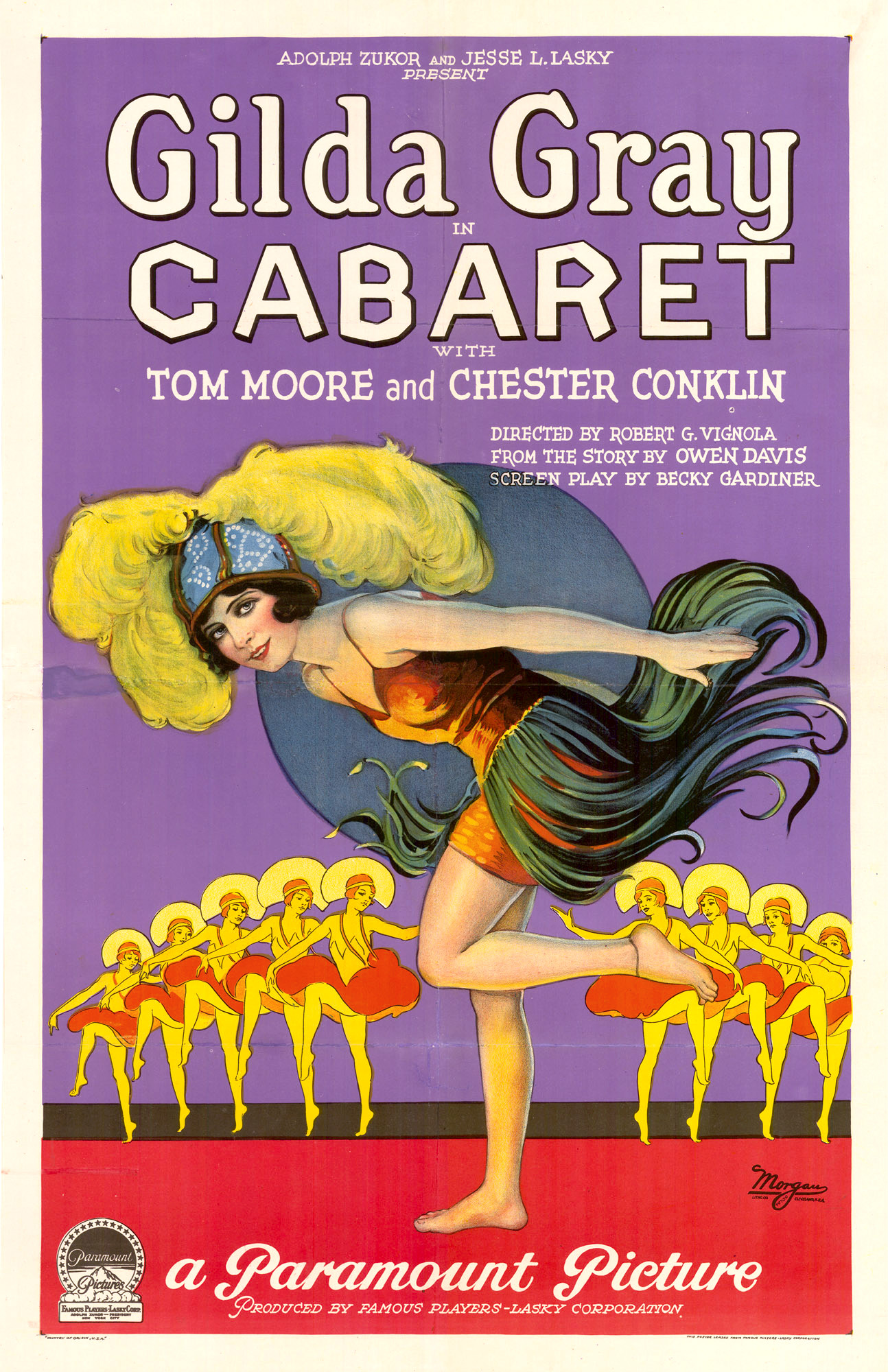
- Film poster
- Directed by: Robert G. Vignola
- Written by: Owen Davis (story); Becky Gardiner (scenario); John W. Conway (intertitles)
- Produced by: Adolph Zukor; Jesse L. Lasky
- Starring: Gilda Gray Tom Moore Chester Conklin
- Cinematography: Harry Fischbeck
- Production company: Famous Players–Lasky Corporation
- Distributed by: Paramount Pictures
- Release date: March 26, 1927
- Running time: 7 reels (6,947 feet)
- Country: United States
- Language: Silent (English intertitles)

Cabaret is a 1927 American silent crime drama film produced by Famous Players–Lasky, distributed by Paramount Pictures, directed by Robert G. Vignola, and starring Gilda Gray.

The film was considered a rival to Paramount's own Underworld released later in 1927. It was the winner of the Photoplay award in 1927.

== Cast ==
- Gilda Gray as Gloria Trask
- Tom Moore as Detective Tom Westcott
- Chester Conklin as Jerry Trask
- Mona Palma as Blanche Howard (Mona was also known as Mimi Palmeri)
- Jack Egan as Andy Trask
- William Harrigan as Jack Costigan
- Charles Byer as Sam Roberts
- Anna Lavsa as Mrs. Trask

== Preservation ==
With no prints of Cabaret located in any film archives, it is a lost film.
