= Wójcin, Żnin County =

Wójcin
- Village
- Location within Poland
- Coordinates: 52°50′15″N 17°53′16″E
- Country: Poland
- Voivodeship: Kuyavian-Pomeranian
- County: Żnin
- Gmina: Żnin

Wójcin [ˈvui̯t͡ɕin] is a village in the administrative district of Gmina Żnin, within Żnin County, Kuyavian-Pomeranian Voivodeship, in north-central Poland.
