= Wiązówka, Masovian Voivodeship =

Wiązówka
- Village
- Location within Poland
- Coordinates: 52°24′26″N 20°13′17″E
- Country: Poland
- Voivodeship: Masovian
- County: Płock
- Gmina: Wyszogród

Wiązówka [vjɔ̃ˈzufka] is a village in the administrative district of Gmina Wyszogród, within Płock County, Masovian Voivodeship, in east-central Poland.
