= Grodkowo, Masovian Voivodeship =

Grodkowo
- Village
- Location within Poland
- Coordinates: 52°26′N 20°12′E
- Country: Poland
- Voivodeship: Masovian
- County: Płock
- Gmina: Wyszogród

Grodkowo [ɡrɔtˈkɔvɔ] is a village in the administrative district of Gmina Wyszogród, within Płock County, Masovian Voivodeship, in east-central Poland.
