= Słomin, Płock County =

Village in Gmina Wyszogród, Poland

Słomin
- Village
- Location within Poland
- Coordinates: 52°29′34″N 20°13′48″E
- Country: Poland
- Voivodeship: Masovian
- County: Płock
- Gmina: Wyszogród

Słomin [ˈswɔmin] is a village in the administrative district of Gmina Wyszogród, within Płock County, Masovian Voivodeship, in east-central Poland.
