= Nowiny-Leśniczówka =

- Village
- Location within Poland
- Coordinates: 52°53′00″N 17°33′28″E
- Country: Poland
- Voivodeship: Kuyavian-Pomeranian
- County: Żnin
- Gmina: Żnin

Nowiny-Leśniczówka (Polish pronunciation: [nɔˈvinɨ lɛɕɲiˈtʂufka]) is a village in the administrative district of Gmina Żnin, within Żnin County, Kuyavian-Pomeranian Voivodeship, in north-central Poland.
