= Chmielewo, Płock County =

Chmielewo
- Village
- Location within Poland
- Coordinates: 52°23′47″N 20°14′06″E
- Country: Poland
- Voivodeship: Masovian
- County: Płock
- Gmina: Wyszogród

Chmielewo [xmjɛˈlɛvɔ] is a village in the administrative district of Gmina Wyszogród, within Płock County, Masovian Voivodeship, in east-central Poland.
