= Rębowo, Masovian Voivodeship =

Rębowo
- Village
- Location within Poland
- Coordinates: 52°24′N 20°11′E
- Country: Poland
- Voivodeship: Masovian
- County: Płock
- Gmina: Wyszogród
- Population: 680

Rębowo [rɛmˈbɔvɔ] is a village in the administrative district of Gmina Wyszogród, within Płock County, Masovian Voivodeship, in east-central Poland.
