= Świerczewo, Kuyavian-Pomeranian Voivodeship =

Świerczewo
- Village
- Location within Poland
- Coordinates: 52°50′49″N 17°38′19″E
- Country: Poland
- Voivodeship: Kuyavian-Pomeranian
- County: Żnin
- Gmina: Żnin

Świerczewo (Polish pronunciation: [ɕfjɛrˈt͡ʂɛvɔ]) is a village in the administrative district of Gmina Żnin, within Żnin County, Kuyavian-Pomeranian Voivodeship, in north-central Poland.
