= Pruszczyn =

- Village
- Location within Poland
- Coordinates: 52°26′43″N 20°11′15″E
- Country: Poland
- Voivodeship: Masovian
- County: Płock
- Gmina: Wyszogród

Pruszczyn [ˈpruʂt͡ʂɨn] is a village in the administrative district of Gmina Wyszogród, within Płock County, Masovian Voivodeship, in east-central Poland.
