= Kępa, Kuyavian-Pomeranian Voivodeship =

Kępa
- Village
- Country: Poland
- Voivodeship: Kuyavian-Pomeranian
- County: Żnin
- Gmina: Żnin

Kępa [ˈkɛmpa] is a village in the administrative district of Gmina Żnin, within Żnin County, Kuyavian-Pomeranian Voivodeship, in north-central Poland.
