= Brzyskorzystewko =

- Village
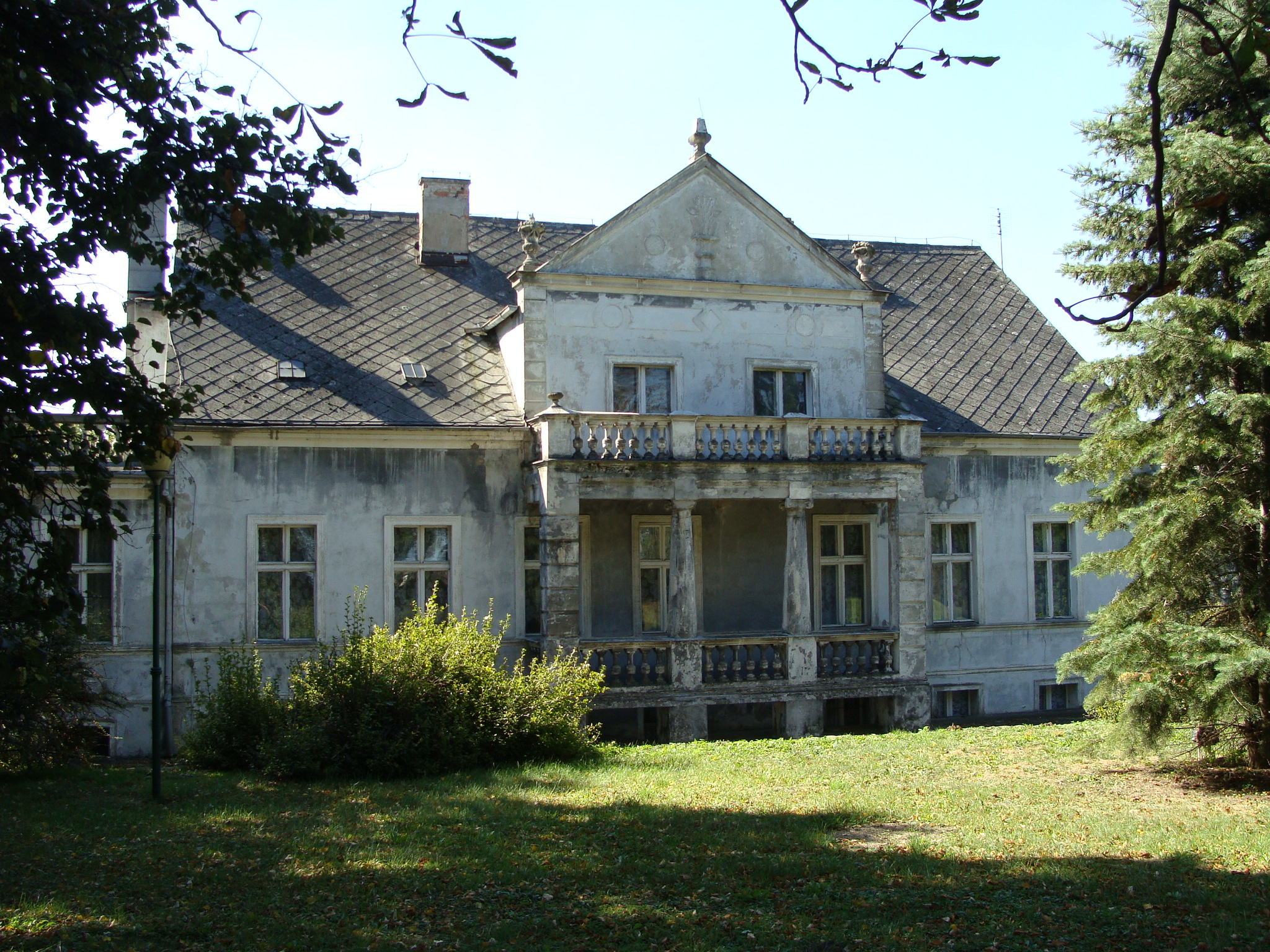
- Brzysotykewko Manor House, circa 1873

- Location within Poland
- Coordinates: 52°53′33″N 17°41′31″E
- Country: Poland
- Voivodeship: Kuyavian-Pomeranian
- County: Żnin
- Gmina: Żnin
- Population: 790 (2,006)

Brzyskorzystewko [bʐɨskɔʐɨsˈtɛfkɔ] is a village in the administrative district of Gmina Żnin, within Żnin County, Kuyavian-Pomeranian Voivodeship, in north-central Poland. As per the suffix "ko," it is the smaller village compared to the nearby Brzyskorzystew.
