= Gilda Gray =

Polish-American dancer and actress (1895–1959)

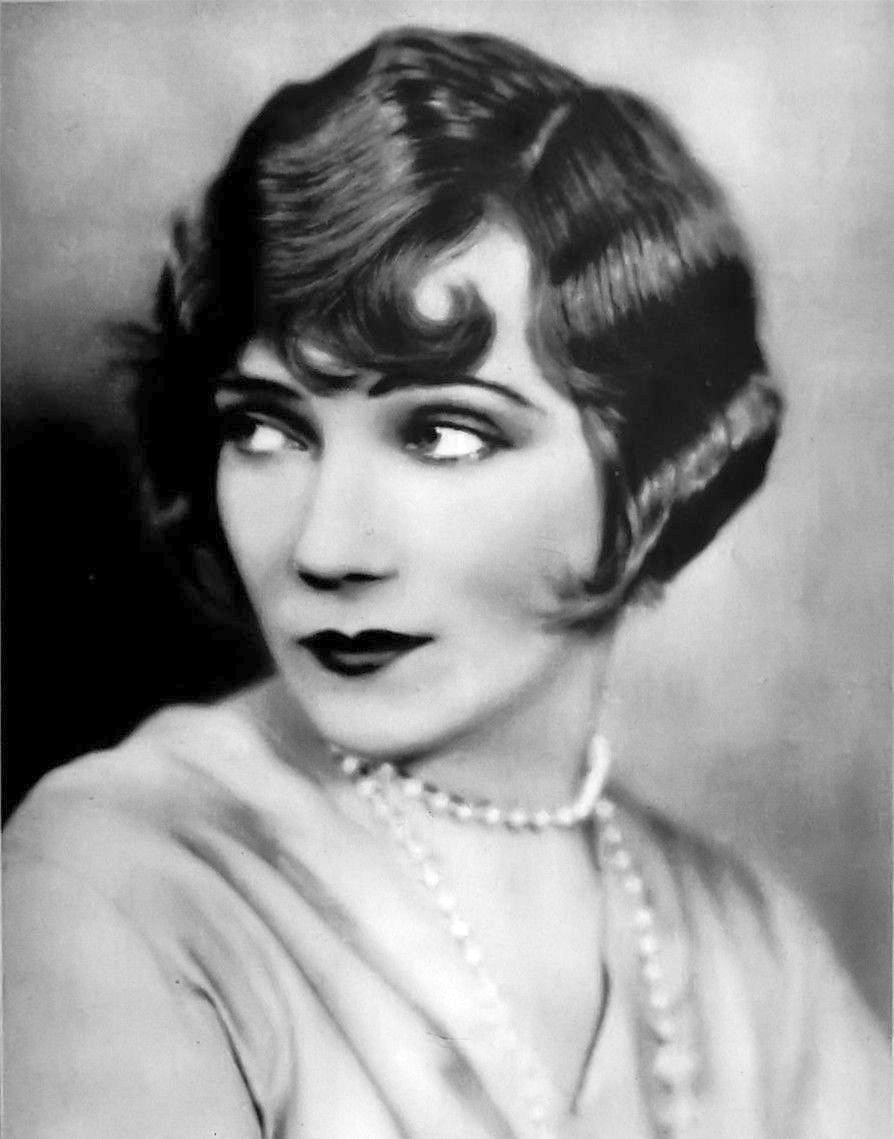
- Gray c.1920
- Born: Marianna Michalska; October 25, 1895; Rydlewo, German Empire (present-day Poland)
- Died: December 22, 1959 (aged 63); Los Angeles, California, U.S.
- Resting place: Holy Cross Cemetery, Culver City, U.S.
- Occupations: Dancer, actress
- Years active: 1918–1958
- Known for: Popularizing the "shimmy"
- Spouses: John Gorecki (div. 1923) Gaillard T. "Gil" Boag (m. 1923; div. 1929) Hector Briceño de Saa (m. 1933; div. 1938)
- Children: 1

Gilda Gray (born Marianna Michalska; October 25, 1895 – December 22, 1959) was a Polish-American dancer and actress who popularized a dance called the "shimmy" which became fashionable in 1920s films and theater productions.

== Early life and 'the shimmy' ==
Gilda Gray claimed herself to have been born on 24 October 1901 in Kraków (then part of Galicia-Lodomeria, Austria-Hungary, and now part of Poland) and she was an adopted child of Maksymilian (Max) and Wanda Michalski (née Kuras). However, according to her birth certificate she was born on 25 October 1895 in a village Rydlewo near Żnin (Żnin County, Kuyavian-Pomeranian Voivodeship) and Maksymilian and Wanda Michalski were her biological parents. In 1903 she emigrated with her parents to the United States. She had one sister, Josephine, who was born in 1904 in Bayonne, New Jersey.

In 1907, the family moved to Cudahy, Wisconsin, a suburb of Milwaukee. At the age of only 14 or 15, Gray entered into an arranged marriage with John Gorecki, a concert violinist, who was the son of Socialist, Wisconsin State Assembly member, and union leader Martin Gorecki. The couple had one child, then divorced in 1923. Their son later became a bandleader, performing under the name Martin Gray (1913–1969).

Although the shimmy is said to have been introduced to American audiences by Gray in New York in 1919, the term was widely used before, and the shimmy was already a well-known dance move. Gray appropriated it as her own, saying that she had accidentally invented the shimmy while dancing at her father-in-law's Cudahy saloon and "shaking her chemise" (or her "shimee", as her Polish accent rendered it).

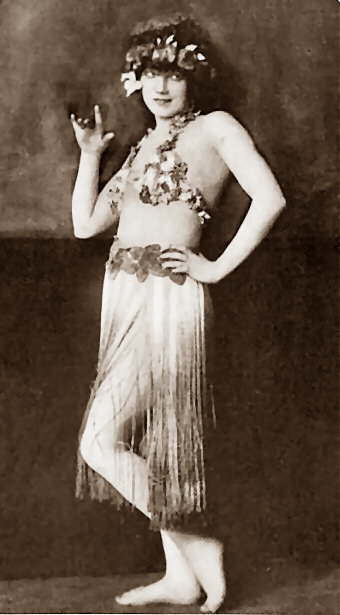
Gilda Gray as the Hula-Hula Girl in Theatre Magazine, April 1922

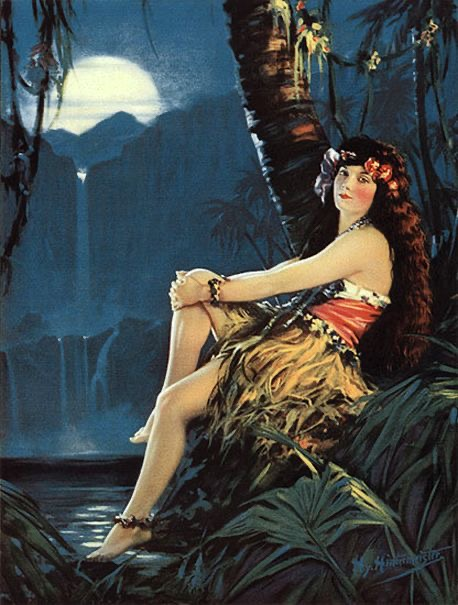
Publicity photo remade into painting, "South Sea Island idyll" by Henry Hintermeister, c. 1922.

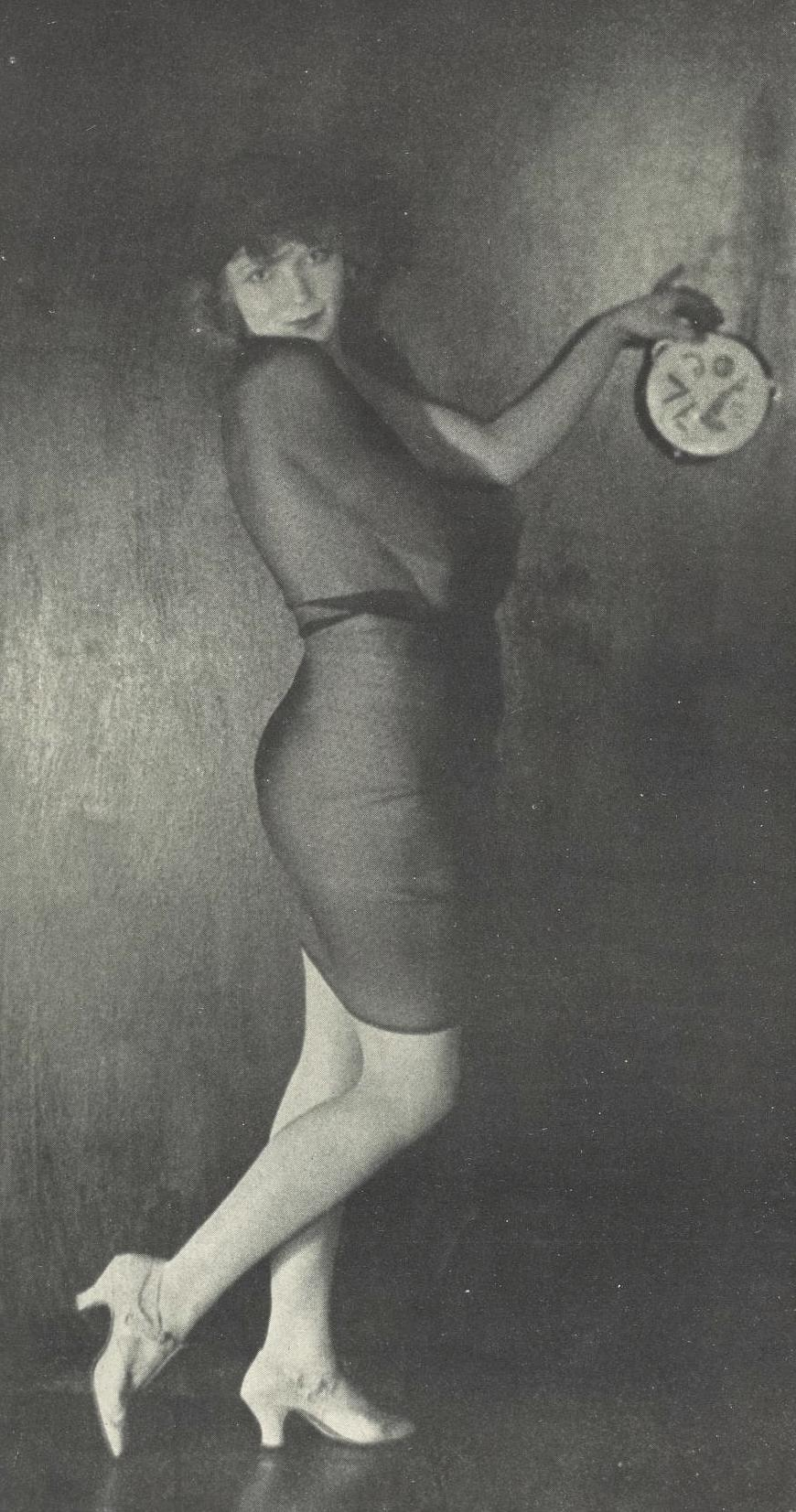
Gilda Gray in October 1921

Gray attributed the origin of the shimmy to the American Indian in an interview published in the July 8, 1919 issue of Variety. The article notes she was working at the time at Reisenweber's with her partner Mildred Vernon. Gray had just been signed to perform in the Gaieties of 1919 when she described the dance, saying "The original shimmy dance has never been properly introduced in New York. I know for I studied the dancing characteristics of the Indians for a long time and they are really responsible for the shimmy which they labeled the 'Shima Shiwa'. There have been continual efforts on the part of this dancer and that one, with each declaring that his or her version is the 'original.' There is no doubt but that the shimmy dance as it was constructed by the American Indians...would have a greater popularity were it done right."

== Career ==
Her desire to continue her burgeoning career (she used the professional name Mary Gray for a while) and her faltering relationship with her husband prompted her to relocate to Chicago, where she was noticed by a talent agent, Frank Westphal, who took her to New York and introduced her to his wife, singer Sophie Tucker. It was Tucker who prompted her to change her first name to Gilda. By 1919, she was appearing in a J.J. Shubert show, The Gaieties of 1919. By 1920, Gray found a new manager, Gaillard T. "Gil" Boag. She was subsequently hired by Florenz Ziegfeld to perform in the 1922 Ziegfeld Follies, and her shimmy became a national craze.

After her divorce from her first husband, she married Gil Boag in 1923 and took her successful vaudeville act to Hollywood, California; they divorced four years later. She quickly abandoned vaudeville to become a film star, and between 1919 and 1936, Gray made several movies, in all of which she performed her famous shimmy. Her second role was a small part in Girl with the Jazz Heart.

Jesse Lasky signed her to a contract with Famous Players–Lasky, which released films through Paramount Pictures. With him she made Aloma of the South Seas (1926), which grossed $3 million in its first three months. The success of this Paramount film was enhanced by Gray's personal appearances doing the shimmy as a promotion. In 1927, she made two more films, The Devil Dancer and Cabaret.

By January 1929, she had sued Gil Boag for divorce on grounds of cruel treatment. He, in turn, accused her of an affair with C.D. Krepps, her tour manager.

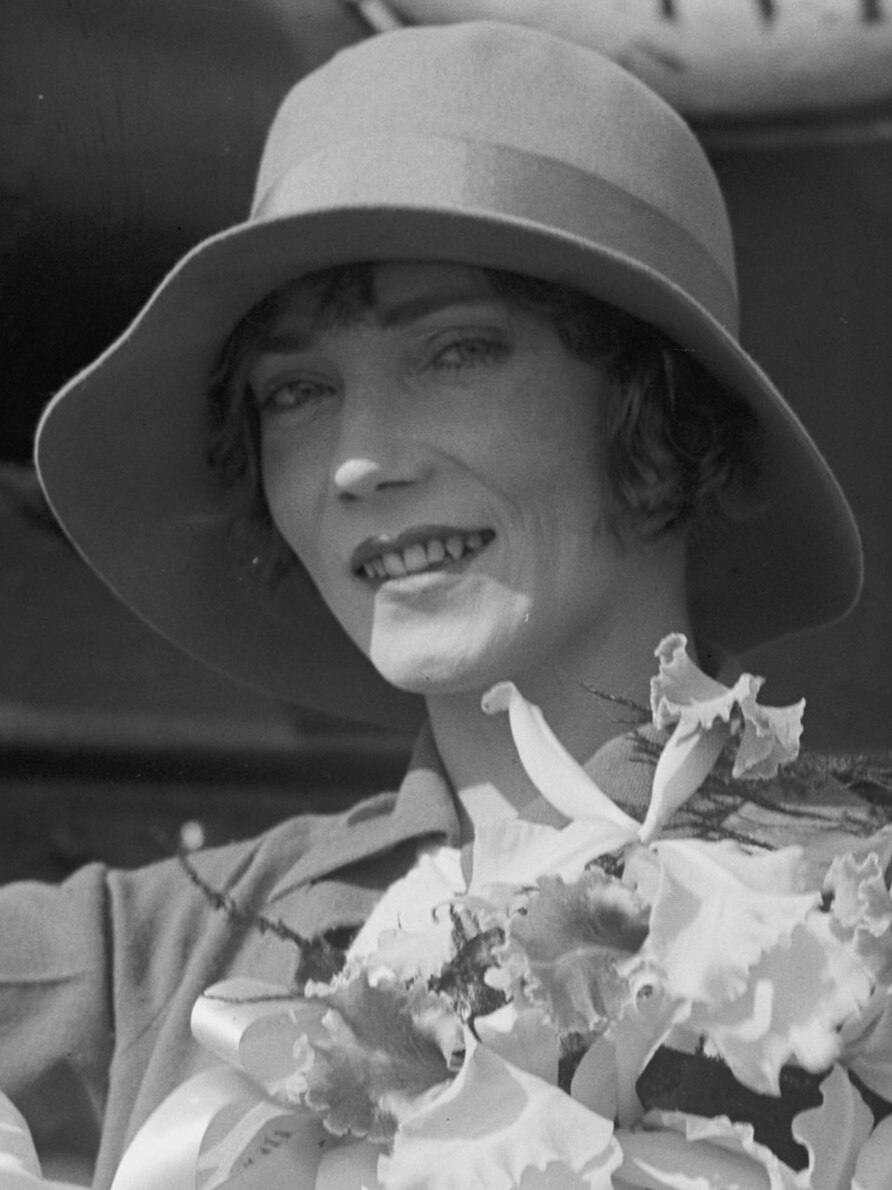
Gilda Grey in 1928

In 1928, she went to England to star in Piccadilly, a 1929 silent film written for her by Arnold Bennett that appeared in the United States with added sound and effects. In his July 15, 1929, review, The New York Times critic Mordaunt Hall praised her performance, adding: "Miss Gray seems to have been rediscovered as an actress. For a long time she has been docketed as an exponent of 'shimmy,' but in Piccadilly she appears to show that acting is not above her. A prophet apparently is without honor; Miss Gray found it necessary to flee to English studios to have a chance."

== 1929 stock market crash ==
When the stock market crashed in 1929, Gray lost most of her financial assets, but she managed to get a job dancing at the Palace Theatre in New York City. She also appeared on stage in Cleveland, and became the subject for two popular ceramic sculptures by Waylande Gregory: "The Nautch Dancer" and "The Burlesque Dancer".

She attempted comebacks but was hindered by poor health from regaining her status as a star. In 1931, she suffered a heart attack. In 1932, Gray announced her engagement to singer Art Jarrett, but abandoned their marriage plans when it became clear that the five-day waiting period between filing a marriage license and the actual ceremony could not be waived. On May 23, 1933, she married Venezuelan diplomat Hector Briceño de Saa. The couple separated two years later and divorced in 1938.

== Polish patriot ==
During World War II, Gray worked for Poland including raising money. In 1953, Ralph Edwards did her life story on the television show This Is Your Life. He portrayed her courage in bringing six Polish citizens to America during the Cold War era. Gray also subsidized their education. She was decorated by Poland "for her interest and help to her countrymen and her country".

== Death ==
On December 22, 1959, died of an apparent heart attack at the home of friends in Hollywood, aged 63.

== Filmography ==
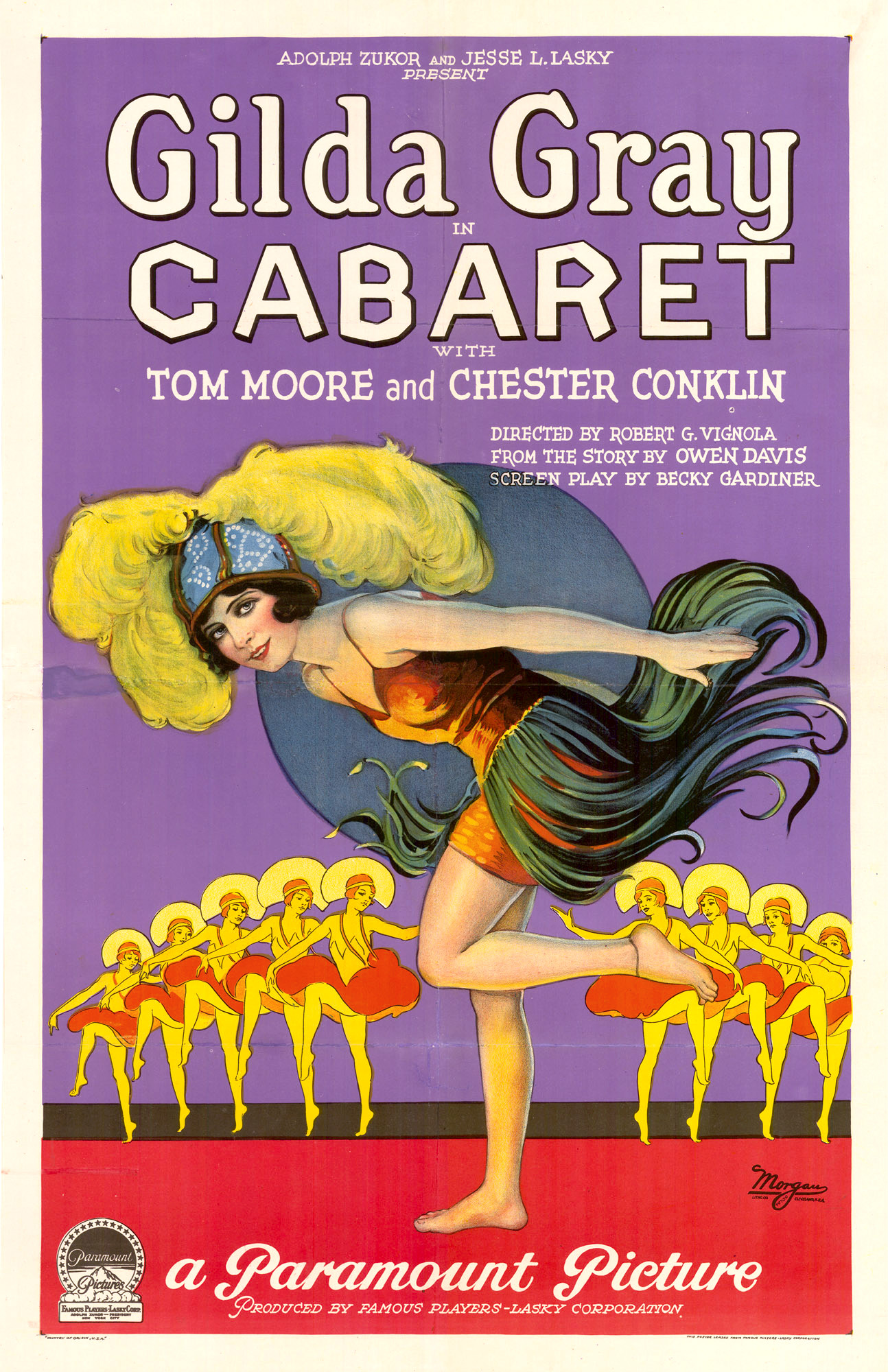
Poster for Cabaret (1927)

Year	Title	Role	Notes
1919	A Virtuous Vamp	Minor Role	
1921	Girl with the Jazz Heart		
1923	Lawful Larceny	Dancer	Lost film
1926	Aloma of the South Seas	Aloma	Lost film
1927	Cabaret	Gloria Trask	Lost film
1927	The Devil Dancer	Takla (The Devil Dancer)	Lost film
1929	Piccadilly	Mabel Greenfield	
1931	He Was Her Man	Frankie	short
1936	The Great Ziegfeld		
1936	Rose-Marie	Belle	

== Plays ==
- Music Box Revue (1921)
- Ziegfeld Follies (1922)
- Devil Dancer Play (1927)

== Sources ==
- The Los Angeles Times, Shimmy Dancer Gilda Gray Dies, December 23, 1959, page 2.
- The New York Times, "Gilda Gray Dead on Coast at 58; Creator of Shimmy Was Singer", December 23, 1959, page 27.
