= Nowiny, Żnin County =

Nowiny
- Village
- Location within Poland
- Coordinates: 52°53′6″N 17°32′44″E
- Country: Poland
- Voivodeship: Kuyavian-Pomeranian
- County: Żnin
- Gmina: Żnin

Nowiny [nɔˈvinɨ] is a village in the administrative district of Gmina Żnin, within Żnin County, Kuyavian-Pomeranian Voivodeship, in north-central Poland.
