= Brzyskorzystew =

- Village
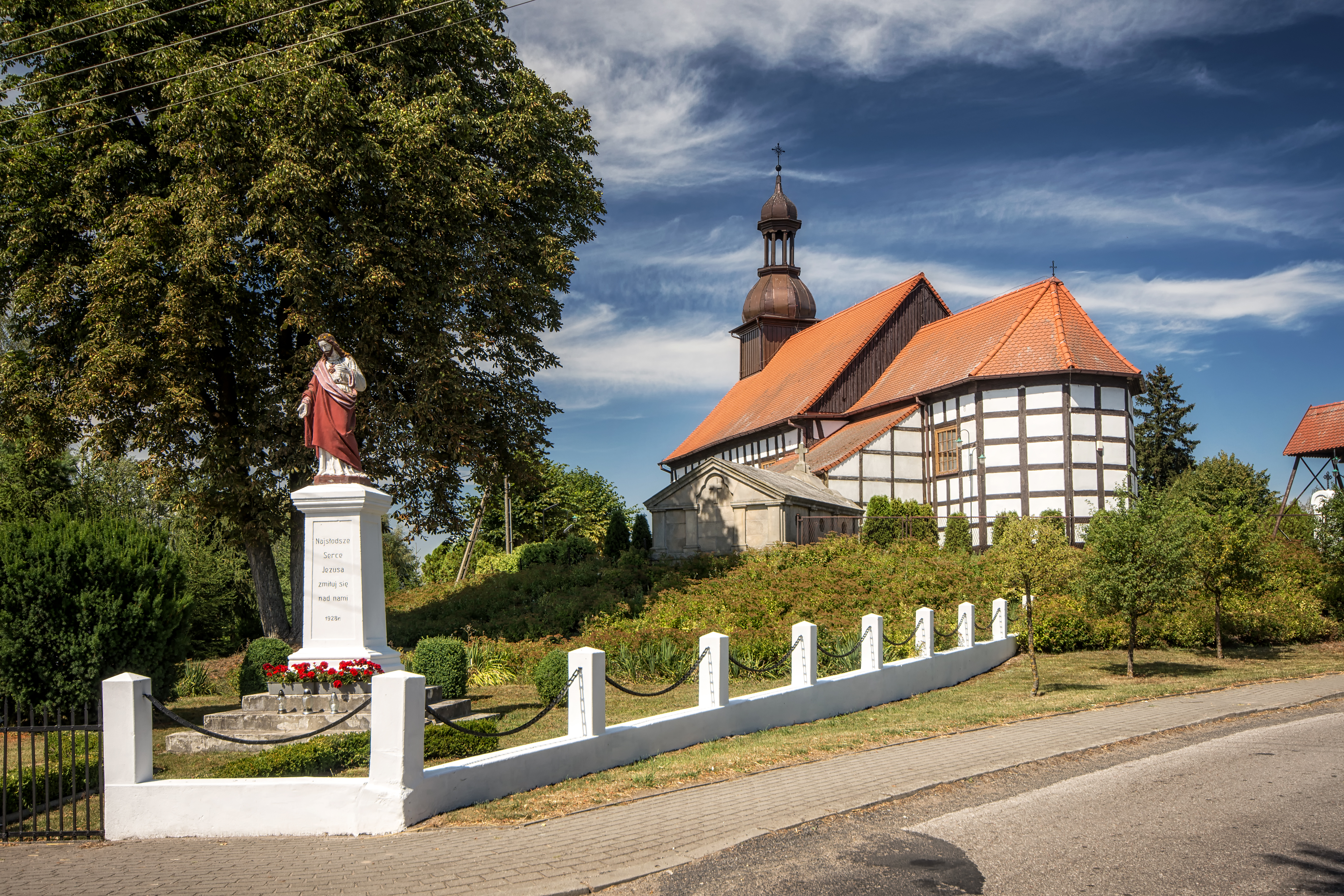
- Saint Catherine church in Brzyskorzystew

- Location within Poland
- Coordinates: 52°54′N 17°39′E
- Country: Poland
- Voivodeship: Kuyavian-Pomeranian
- County: Żnin
- Gmina: Żnin
- Time zone: UTC+1 (CET)
  - Summer (DST): UTC+2 (CEST)
- Vehicle registration: CZN

Brzyskorzystew [bʐɨskɔˈʐɨstɛf] is a village in the administrative district of Gmina Żnin, within Żnin County, Kuyavian-Pomeranian Voivodeship, in central Poland. The village has been noted in records since at least the 1100s and was previously called Bezkorzyst. There is also a neighboring smaller village, Brzyskorzystewko, nearby. Four Polish citizens were murdered by Nazi Germany in the village during World War II.
