= Rydlewo =

- Village
- Location within Poland
- Coordinates: 52°50′N 17°44′E
- Country: Poland
- Voivodeship: Kuyavian-Pomeranian
- County: Żnin
- Gmina: Żnin

Rydlewo [rɨdˈlɛvɔ] is a village in the administrative district of Gmina Żnin, within Żnin County, Kuyavian-Pomeranian Voivodeship, in north-central Poland.

The Polish-American dancer and actress Gilda Gray (Marianna Michalska, 1901–1959) was born in Rydlewo.
