= Bożejewice, Żnin County =

Bożejewice
- Village
- Location within Poland
- Coordinates: 52°48′59″N 17°40′49″E
- Country: Poland
- Voivodeship: Kuyavian-Pomeranian
- County: Żnin
- Gmina: Żnin
- Population: 185

Bożejewice [bɔʐɛjɛˈvit͡sɛ] is a village in the administrative district of Gmina Żnin, within Żnin County, Kuyavian-Pomeranian Voivodeship, in north-central Poland.
