= Drwały, Gmina Wyszogród =

Drwały
- Village
- Location within Poland
- Coordinates: 52°23′43″N 20°06′39″E
- Country: Poland
- Voivodeship: Masovian
- County: Płock
- Gmina: Wyszogród

Drwały [ˈdrvawɨ] is a village in the administrative district of Gmina Wyszogród, within Płock County, Masovian Voivodeship, in east-central Poland.
