= Wilczkowo, Masovian Voivodeship =

Wilczkowo
- Village
- Location within Poland
- Coordinates: 52°24′N 20°9′E
- Country: Poland
- Voivodeship: Masovian
- County: Płock
- Gmina: Wyszogród

Wilczkowo [vilt͡ʂˈkɔvɔ] is a village in the administrative district of Gmina Wyszogród, within Płock County, Masovian Voivodeship, in east-central Poland.
