= Podgórzyn, Kuyavian-Pomeranian Voivodeship =

Podgórzyn
- Village
- Location within Poland
- Coordinates: 52°50′N 17°45′E
- Country: Poland
- Voivodeship: Kuyavian-Pomeranian
- County: Żnin
- Gmina: Żnin

Podgórzyn [pɔdˈɡuʐɨn] is a village in the administrative district of Gmina Żnin, within Żnin County, Kuyavian-Pomeranian Voivodeship, in north-central Poland.
