= Sarbinowo, Kuyavian-Pomeranian Voivodeship =

Sarbinowo
- Village
- Location within Poland
- Coordinates: 52°51′5″N 17°39′54″E
- Country: Poland
- Voivodeship: Kuyavian-Pomeranian
- County: Żnin
- Gmina: Żnin
- Population: 540

Sarbinowo [sarbiˈnɔvɔ] is a village in north-central Poland, located in the administrative district of Gmina Żnin, within Żnin County, Kuyavian-Pomeranian Voivodeship.
