= Aloma of the South Seas (1926 film) =

1926 film directed by Maurice Tourneur

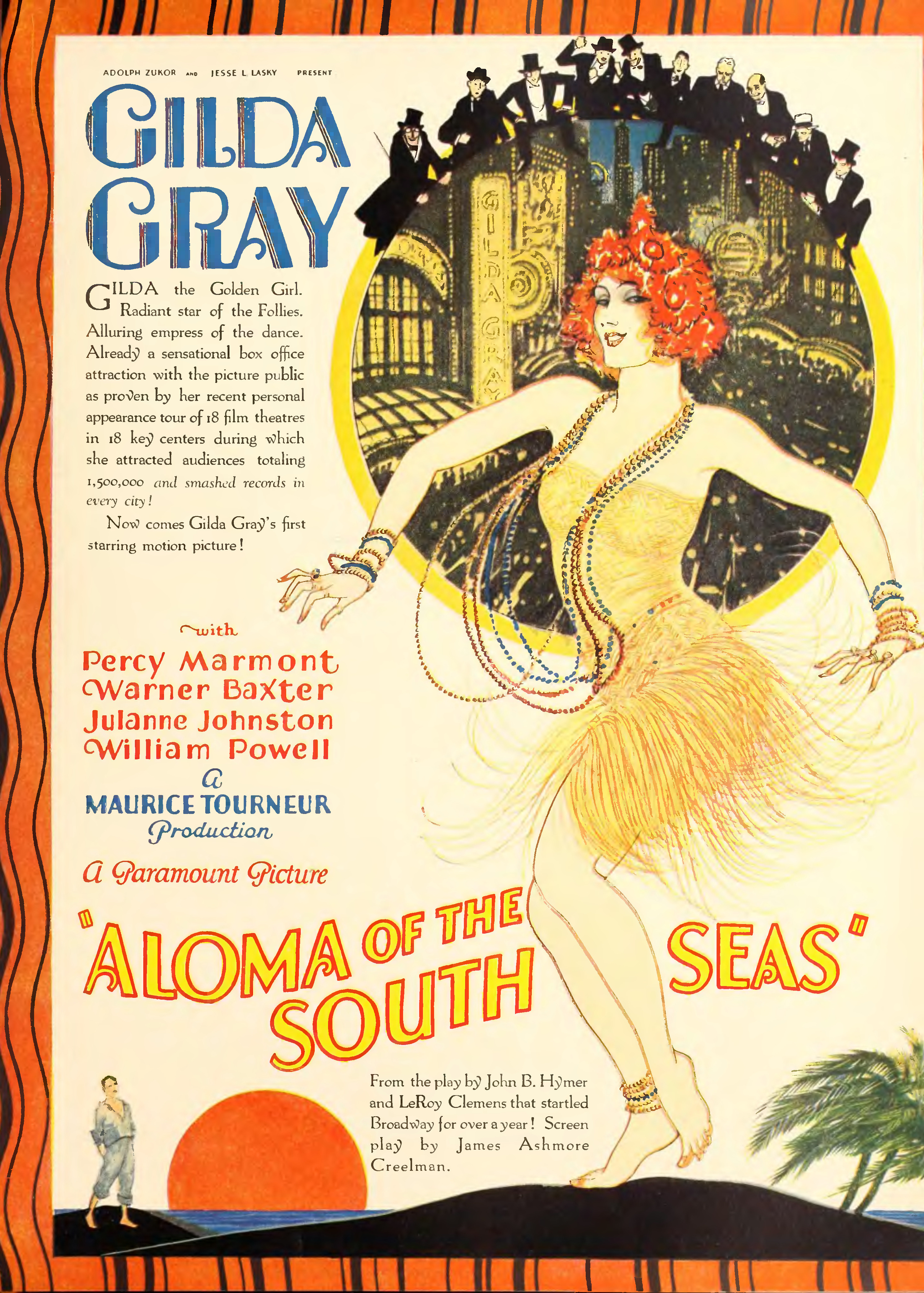
- 1926 advertisement
- Directed by: Maurice Tourneur
- Written by: James Ashmore Creelman
- Based on: Aloma of the South Seas by John B. Hymer and LeRoy Clemens
- Produced by: E. Lloyd Sheldon; Maurice Tourneur; Adolph Zukor; Jesse L. Lasky
- Starring: Gilda Gray; Percy Marmont; Warner Baxter
- Cinematography: Harry Fischbeck
- Edited by: E. Lloyd Sheldon
- Music by: Robert Hood Bowers
- Production company: Famous Players–Lasky
- Distributed by: Paramount Pictures
- Release date: May 16, 1926
- Running time: 90 minutes
- Country: United States
- Language: Silent (English intertitles)
- Budget: $225,000
- Box office: US$ 3 million

Aloma of the South Seas is a lost 1926 American silent comedy drama film starring Gilda Gray as an erotic dancer, filmed in Puerto Rico and Bermuda, and based on a 1925 play of the same title by John B. Hymer and LeRoy Clemens.

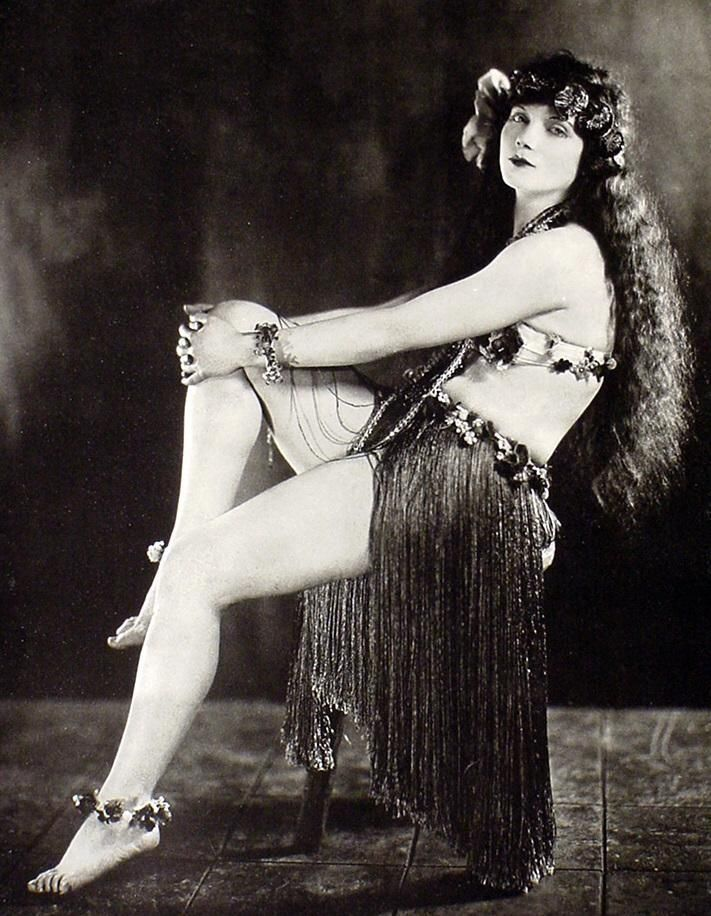
Gilda Gray, 1922 publicity photo

The film was spoofed by a 1926 Mutt and Jeff animated cartoon, Aroma of the South Seas.

== Plot ==
Bob Holden, an embittered war veteran, has gone to the South Seas to drown in drink the memory of his old girlfriend, Sylvia who has married his best friend, Van Templeton in his absence. This happened only because Templeton withheld word from Sylvia that Holden had survived the war. In the South Seas, Holden becomes the object of Aloma's loving and ministering attentions and eventually promises to marry her. Naturally, Nuitane, Aloma's abandoned Polynesian boyfriend is jealous. The plot gets thicker when Templeton and Sylvia arrive on the island rather inexplicably. Templeton tries to force himself upon Aloma but is foiled by Holden. The jilted Nuitane decides to feed Holden to the sharks, but suddenly realizes that Templeton is the extra man in the love pentagon. As Templeton is devoured, Nuitane calmly observes: “Sharks not eat Nuitane—sharks like white meat.” Minus the evil interloper, the two couples fall happily into a race-appropriate (for that era) clinch.

== Cast ==
- Gilda Gray as Aloma
- Percy Marmont as Bob Holden
- Warner Baxter as Nuitane
- William Powell as Van Templeton
- Harry T. Morey as Red Malloy
- Julanne Johnston as Sylvia
- Joseph W. Smiley as Andrew Taylor
- Frank Montgomery as Hongi
- Michelette Burani as Hina (credited as Madame Burani)
- Ernestine Gaines as Taula
- Aurelio Ciccia as Sailor

== Censorship ==
Before the film could be released in Kansas, the Kansas Board of Review required the removal of a dancing scene in reel 2, including "wiggling posterior and slapping hips."

== Release ==
The film premiered at Paramount's Rialto Theatre in New York City on May 16, 1926. Grossing $3 million in the U.S. alone, this was the most successful film of 1926 and the fourth most successful film of the 1920s.

== Preservation ==
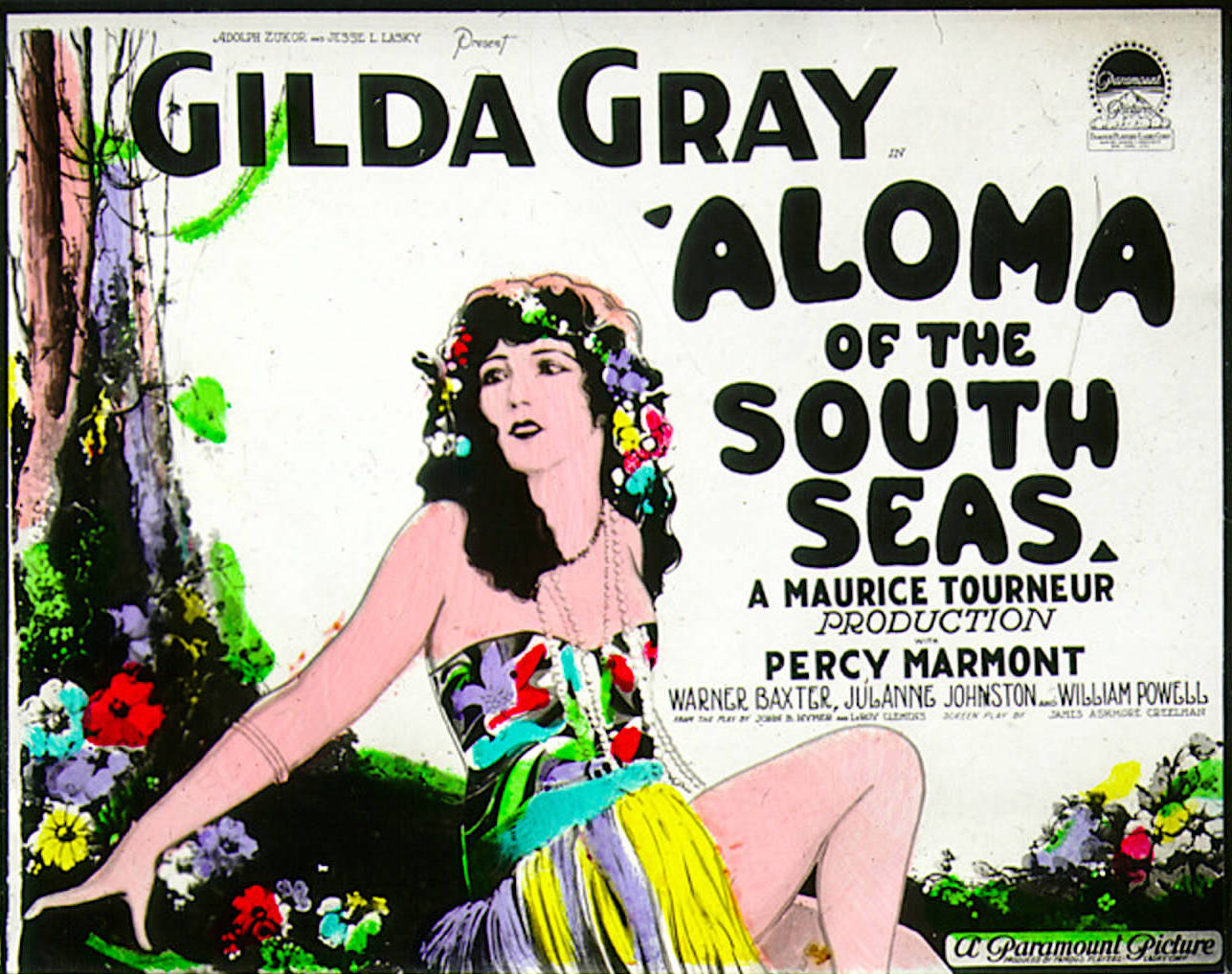
Aloma of the South Seas lantern slide

The film is now considered to be a lost film, although a surviving trailer has resurfaced.

== Remake ==
The film was remade as Aloma of the South Seas (1941), starring Dorothy Lamour and Jon Hall. The plot was completely reworked, leaving only the setting in common with the earlier film.

== See also ==
- List of lost films
- South Seas genre
