= Wenecja, Kuyavian-Pomeranian Voivodeship =

Wenecja
- Village
- Location within Poland
- Coordinates: 52°48′45″N 17°45′51″E
- Country: Poland
- Voivodeship: Kuyavian-Pomeranian
- County: Żnin
- Gmina: Żnin
- Population: 424

Wenecja (pronounced [vɛˈnɛt͡sja]; Polish for "Venice") is a village in the administrative district of Gmina Żnin, within Żnin County, Kuyavian-Pomeranian Voivodeship, in north-central Poland.

The village gained city status in 1392, but lost it before 1400.

Its location among three lakes (Biskupinskie, Weneckie, Skrzynka) resulted in its name alluding to the lagoon of Venice, Italy. The village, dubbed "the pearl of Pałuki", is one of the greatest tourist attractions in the Pałuki region. Wenecja is located on the line of the narrow gauge railway running from the town of Żnin to famous Biskupin and further on to Gąsawa. The Narrow Gauge Railway Museum and the ruins of the 14th-century castle attract tourists to the village.

== History ==
In the 14th century, the settlement belonged to the Nałęczów family. At that time it was called Mościska, which Mikołaj Nałęcz changed to Wenecja after his return from his studies in Venice. He also ordered the construction of a defensive castle and a church, in the place of which there is currently a 19th-century church. In the 14th century, Venice received city status, but this was removed in later years.

== Demographics ==
In the years 1975–1998 the town belonged to the Bydgoszcz Voivodeship. According to the 2021 National Census, it had 424 inhabitants. It is the eighth largest town in the Żnin commune.

Year	Population
1998	282
2002	291
2009	305
2011	333
2014	341
2021	424

== Tourist attractions ==
- Narrow Gauge Railway Museum – its collections include, among others: 17 steam locomotives, a snow plow and a sand spreader
- Castle Ruins
- Neo-Gothic church from the 19th century
- Classicist manor from the 19th century
- Grave of Walenty Szwajcer (discoverer of the Biskupin settlement)

Venice is located on the Piast Trail. The Żnin District Railway also runs through it, although it currently no longer functions as a regular means of transport for local residents. It is a narrow-gauge railway with a rail gauge of only 600 mm, which makes them the narrowest public railway tracks in Europe. During the tourist season, it is possible to take a train ride on the route: Żnin–Wenecja–Biskupin–Gąsawa.

== See also ==
- Biskupin
- Heritage railways
- Kuyavian-Pomeranian Voivodship
- Narrow Gauge Railway Museum in Wenecja
- Pałuki
- Żnin
