= Piast Trail =

The Piast Trail is the oldest tourist and historical trail in Poland. It leads to places associated with the Piast dynasty and connects the most important buildings, monuments and objects related to the beginning of the Polish State.

It stretches out between Greater Poland, Kuyavia and Paluki regions.

The trail leads from Poznan by Pobiedziska, Moraczewo, Ostrow Lednicki, Gniezno, Trzemeszno, Mogilno, Strzelno, Kruszwica, Inowroclaw, Wloclawek and north–south route: Wągrowiec, Lekno, Żnin, Biskupin, Gniezno, Grzybowo Giecz Konin, Kalisz.
