= Wenecja Narrow Gauge Railway Museum =

Open-air museum in Poland

Coordinates: 52°47′51″N 17°44′58″E

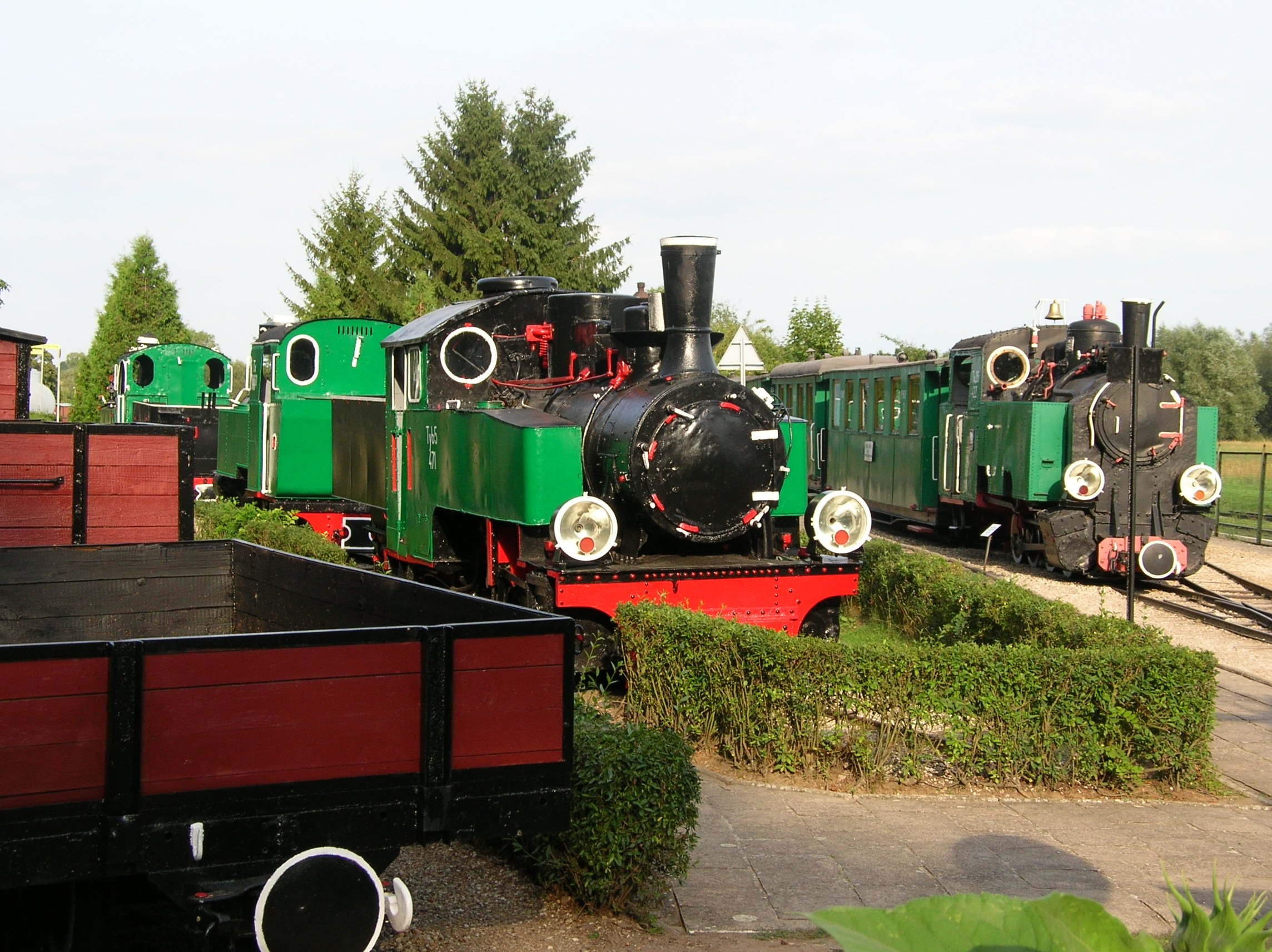
Overview

The Wenecja Narrow Gauge Railway Museum (Polish: Muzeum Kolei Wąskotorowej w Wenecji) (located in Wenecja near Żnin, Poland) is an open-air museum collecting and exhibiting steam locomotives, passenger and freight cars, trolleys, railwaymen's tools, signalling equipment, contents of an old waiting room, old maps. The Narrow Gauge Railway Museum is a department of the Muzeum Ziemi Pałuckiej (the Żnin's Museum of Pałuki Land) and was established in 1972 at a suggestion of enthusiasts of the Pałuki region, of which Żnin is considered the capital. The Museum has collected numerous steam locomotives. One of the oldest is the German one made by Orenstein & Koppel in Berlin in 1900. The Tx-1116 locomotive made by Henschel & Son (Kassel, 1918) and the Tx4-564 locomotive made by Hanomag (Hannover, 1923) are also very interesting. A real rarity is the Belgian locomotive No.2179 made by Les Ateliers Metallurgiques Nivelles with the unique wheel arrangement 4-6-2 ("Pacific"), and the only one which has steam brakes. There are also steam locomotives made in the First Polish Locomotive Plant in Chrzanów, including active Px38.

The Narrow Gauge Railway Museum in Wenecja is situated at the foot of the ruins of the medieval castle built in the 14th century by legendary Mikołaj Nałecz. Tourists can travel on the historic Żnińska Kolej Powiatowa, a 600 mm (1 ft 11 5/8 in) narrow gauge railway from Żnin via Wenecja to Biskupin which is famous for a reconstruction of the Lusatian culture settlement and the Archaeological Museum.

== See also ==
- Biskupin
- Heritage railways
- Pałuki
- Wenecja, Kuyavian-Pomeranian Voivodeship
- Żnin
