= Pałuki =

Region in Poland

- Historical region
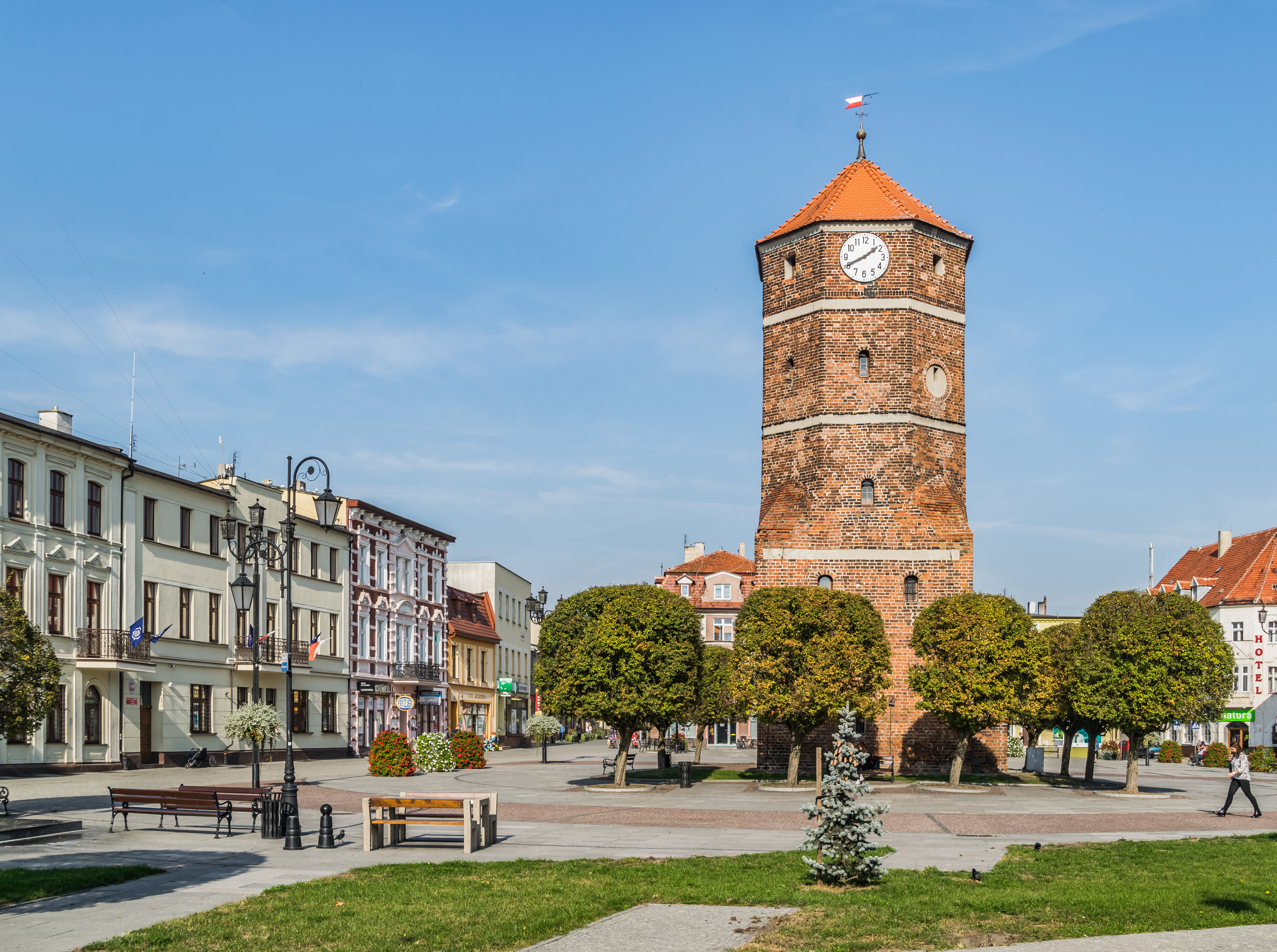
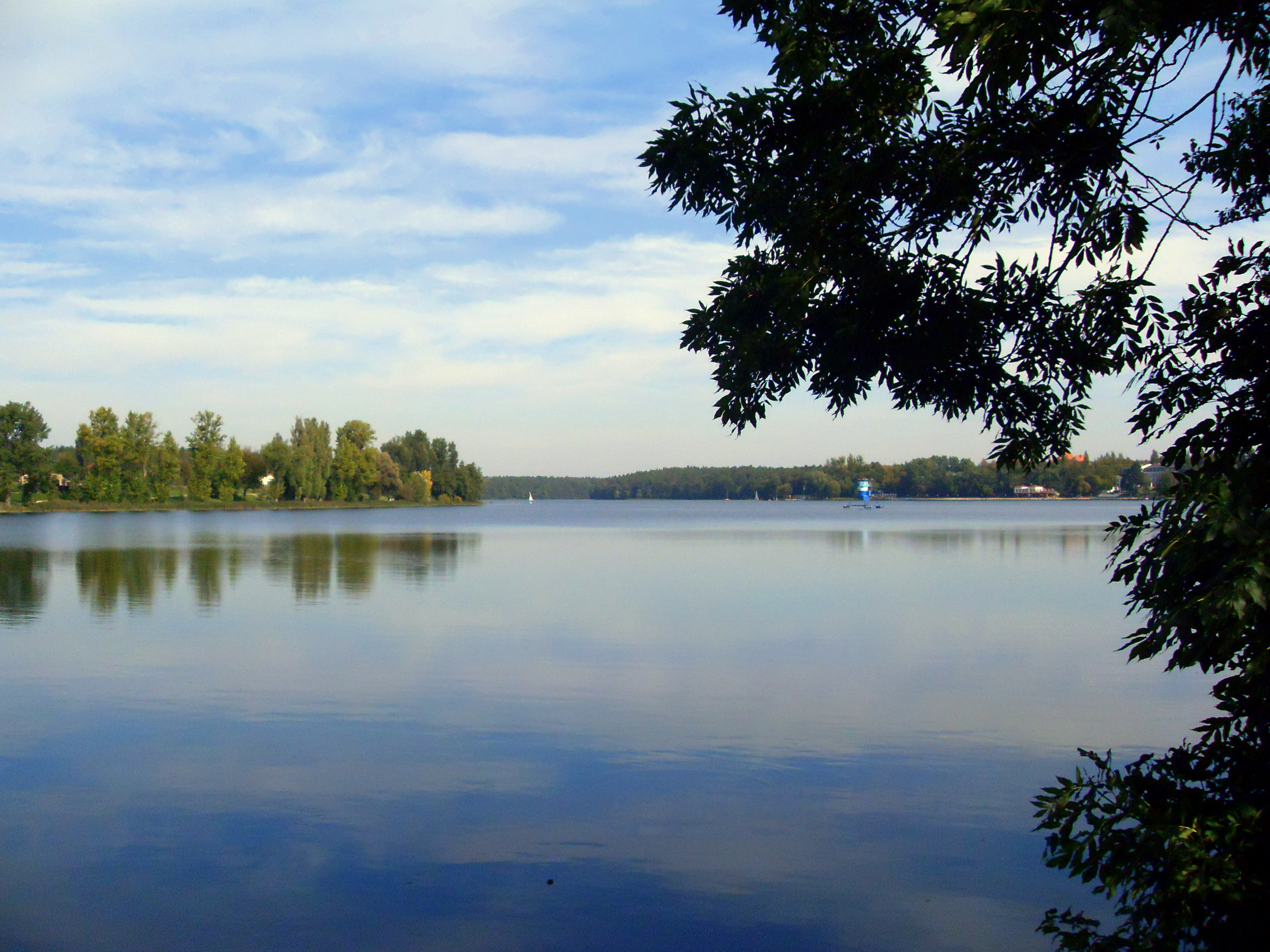
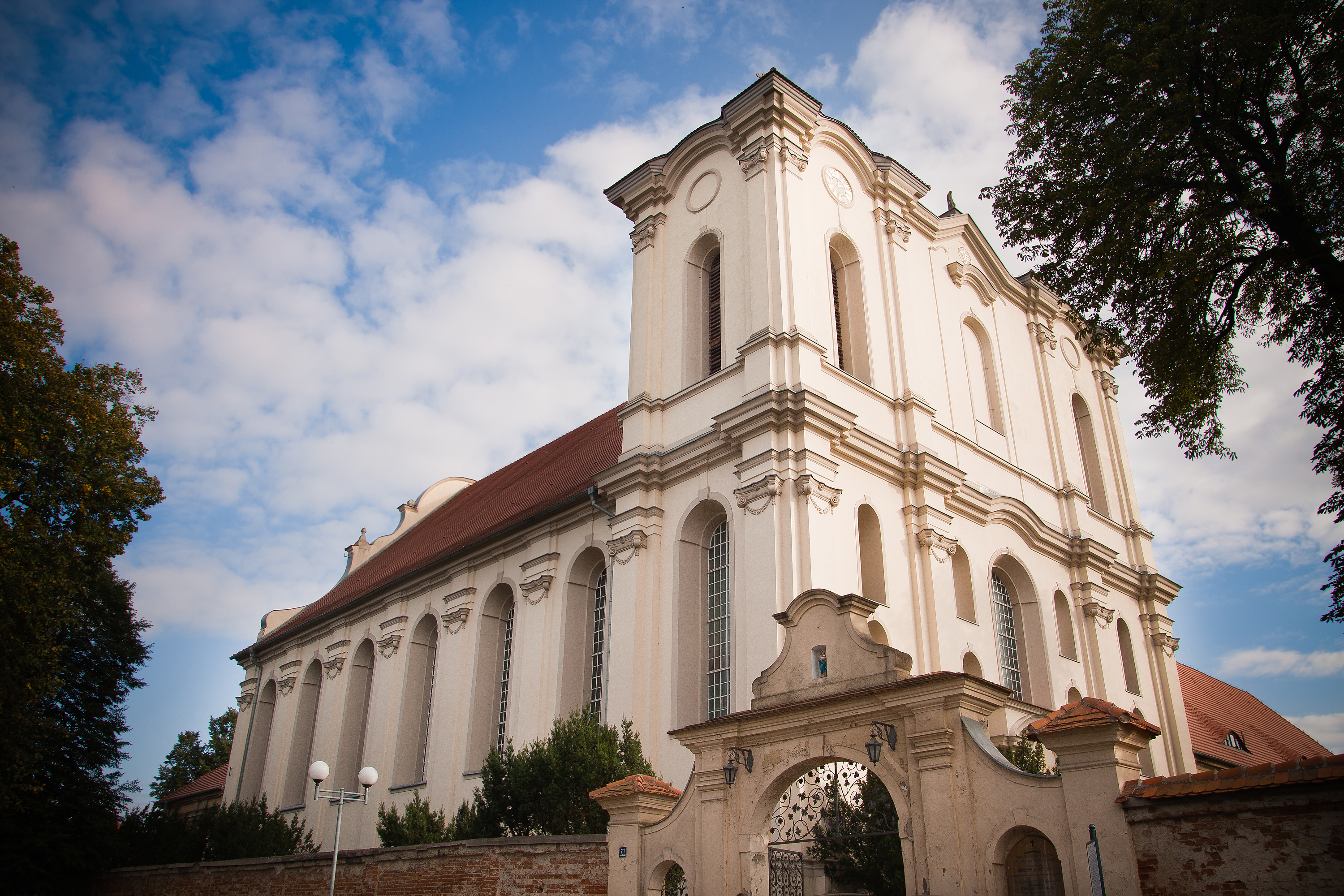
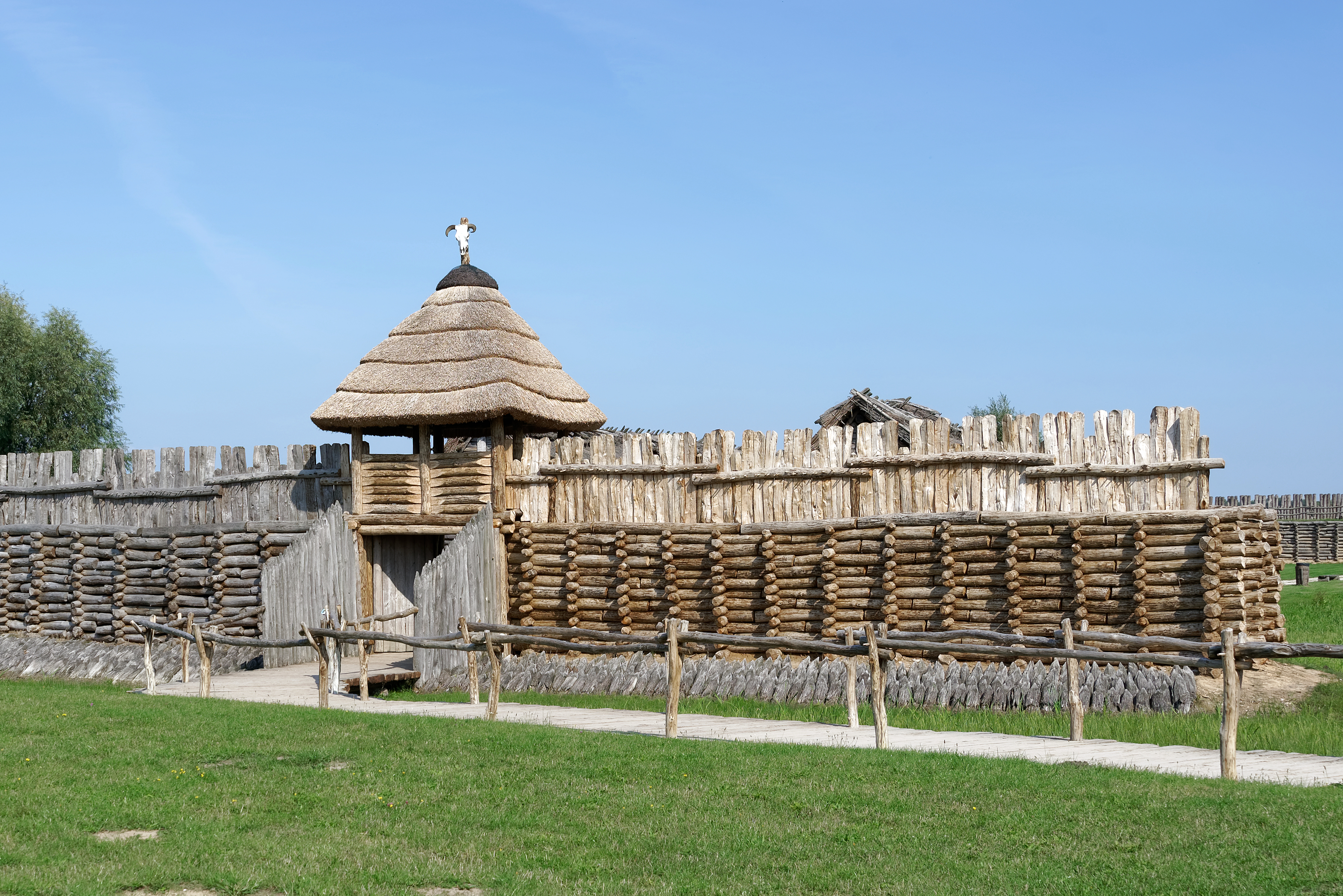
- From top, left to right: Main square in Żnin; Durowo Lake; Wągrowiec Abbey; Biskupin

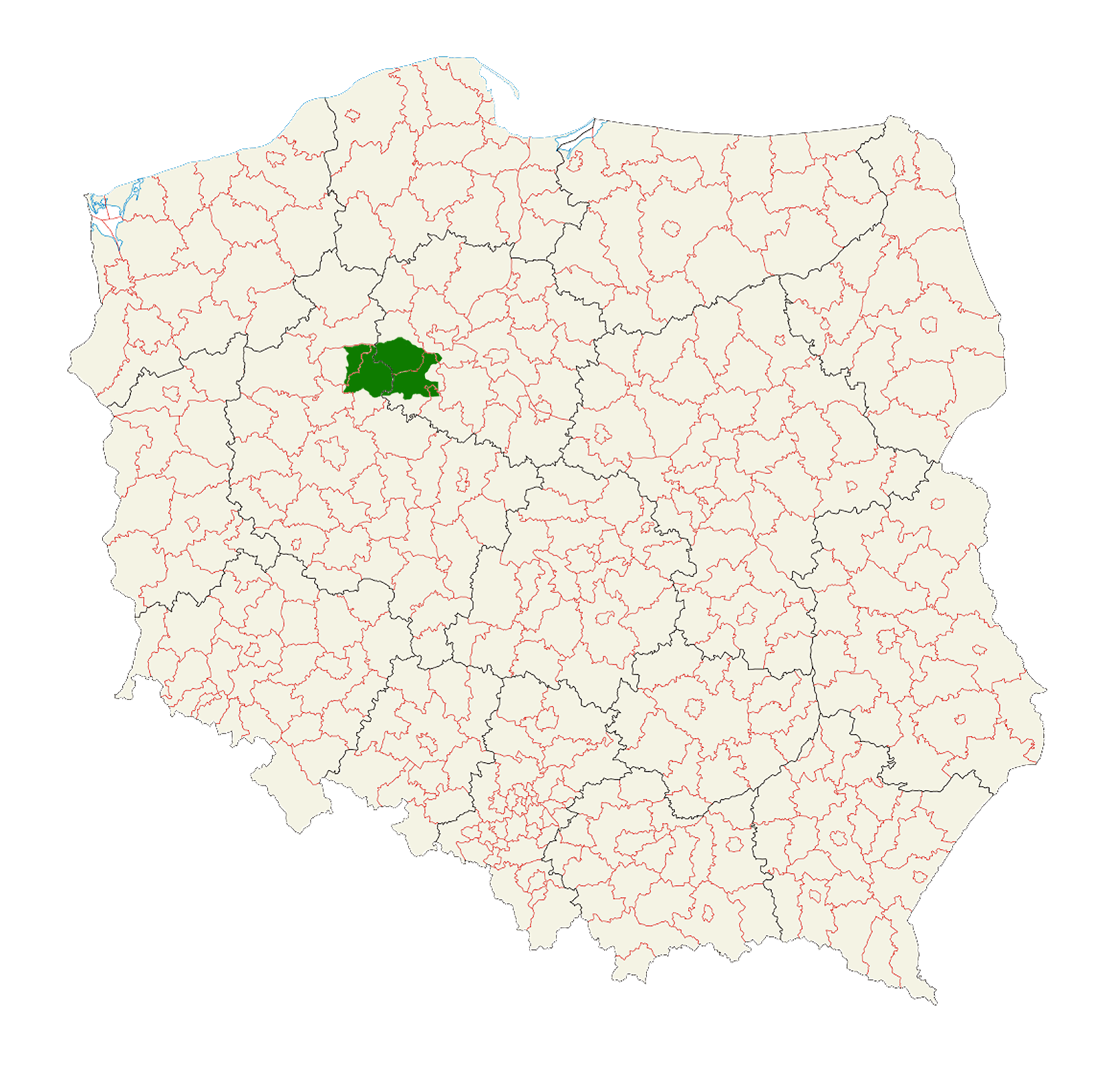
- Pałuki on the map of Poland
- Country: Poland
- Historical region: Greater Poland
- Capital: Żnin
- Largest town: Wągrowiec
- Time zone: UTC+1 (CET)
  - Summer (DST): UTC+2 (CEST)

Pałuki (Polish pronunciation: [paˈwukʲi]) is a historic and ethnographic region lying in central Poland, part of Greater Poland neighbouring Pomerania and Kuyavia. In terms of administrative division the region lies in Kuyavian-Pomeranian Voivodship and Greater Poland Voivodship. A diverse relief, forests and numerous lakes serve as tourist attractions.

Pałuki is commonly called "the land of 130 lakes" or sometimes even "Little Mazury". The "Piast Trail", leading through several places connected with the origins of the Polish State (Gniezno, Kruszwica), runs across the south of Pałuki. Żnin, Szubin, Kcynia and Barcin are major towns of the regions. Biskupin, Wenecja and Gąsawa also attract visitors.

== History ==
The name Pałuki is likely derived from łuk, łęk, or łęg, signifying grassy lowlands between arable land. An alternative theory suggests the name comes from the shape of the small hilltops which dot the landscape. The name appeared in the 14th century in the Latin form terra Palucacensis in documents by Jan of Czarnków and, later, Jan Długosz.

Pałuki formed part of the Kalisz Voivodeship in the Greater Poland Province of the Kingdom of Poland. In 1655, it was invaded by Sweden, and the Battle of Kcynia was fought there.

The region was invaded by Germany during the invasion of Poland, which started World War II in September 1939. The German occupiers launched the Intelligenzaktion genocidal campaign against the Polish population. Major sites of massacres of Poles in the region included Paterek and Bukowiec. The Germans also carried out expulsion of Poles, whose houses and farms were then handed over to German colonists in accordance with the Lebensraum policy. Many Poles were enslaved as forced labour and either sent to German colonists in the region or deported to Germany. The Polish resistance movement was active in the region.

Germany operated the Stalag XXI-B, Oflag XXI-B and Oflag 64 prisoner-of-war camps for Polish, French, British, American, and other Allied POWs in Szubin and Tur.

== Towns ==
- Barcin
- Gąsawa
- Gołańcz
- Janowiec Wielkopolski
- Kcynia
- Łabiszyn
- Margonin
- Szamocin
- Szubin
- Wągrowiec
- Żnin

== See also ==
- Biskupin
- Kuyavian-Pomeranian Voivodship
- Narrow Gauge Railway Museum in Wenecja
- Wenecja, Kuyavian-Pomeranian Voivodeship
- Żnin
