= Wenecja Castle =

Castle in Poland

Coordinates: 52.7975°N 17.8317°E

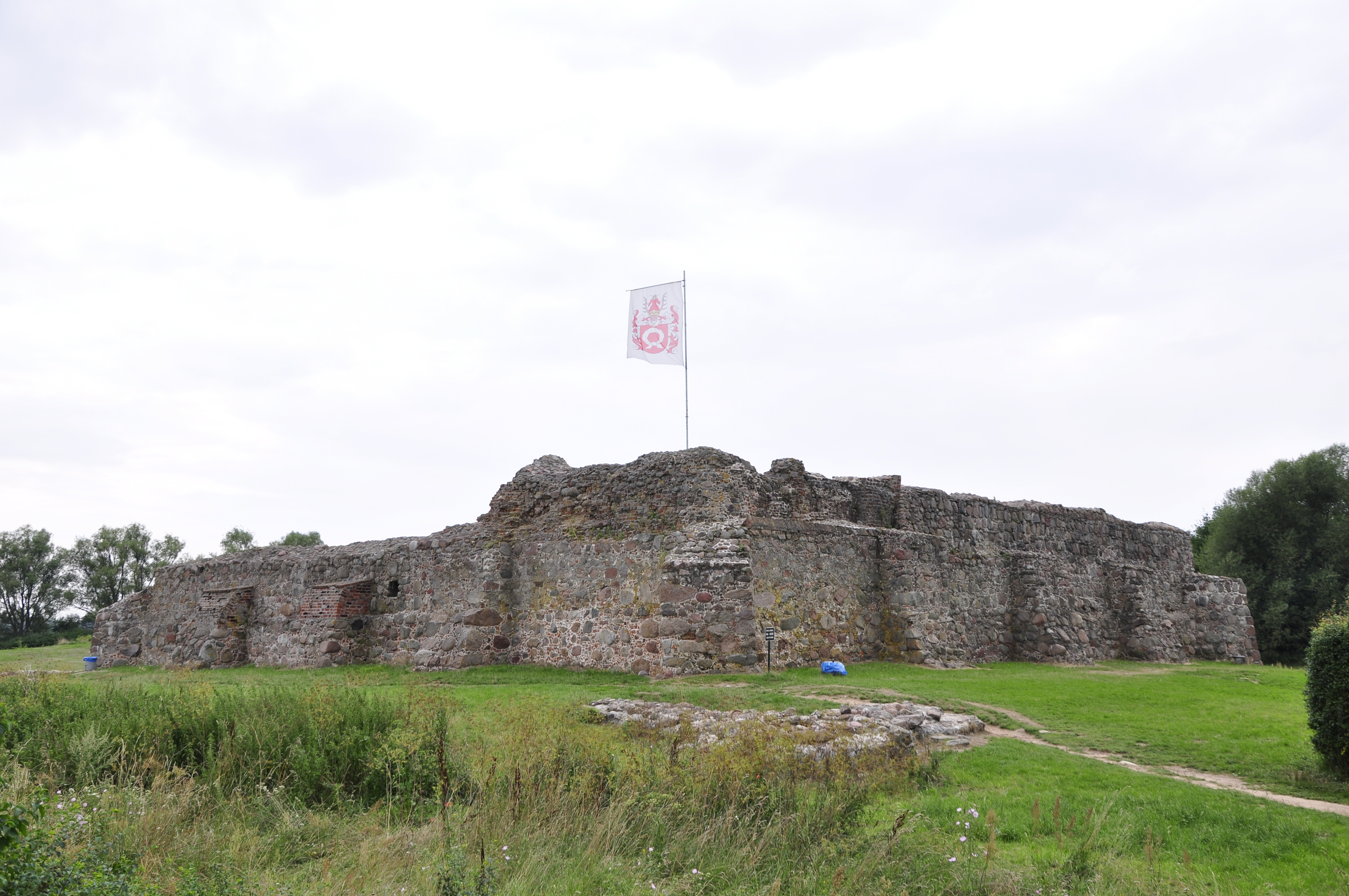
Wenecja Castle ruin

Wenecja Castle is a castle located in Wenecja, Kuyavian-Pomeranian Voivodeship, Poland. It dates back to the 14th century.
