= Żnin =

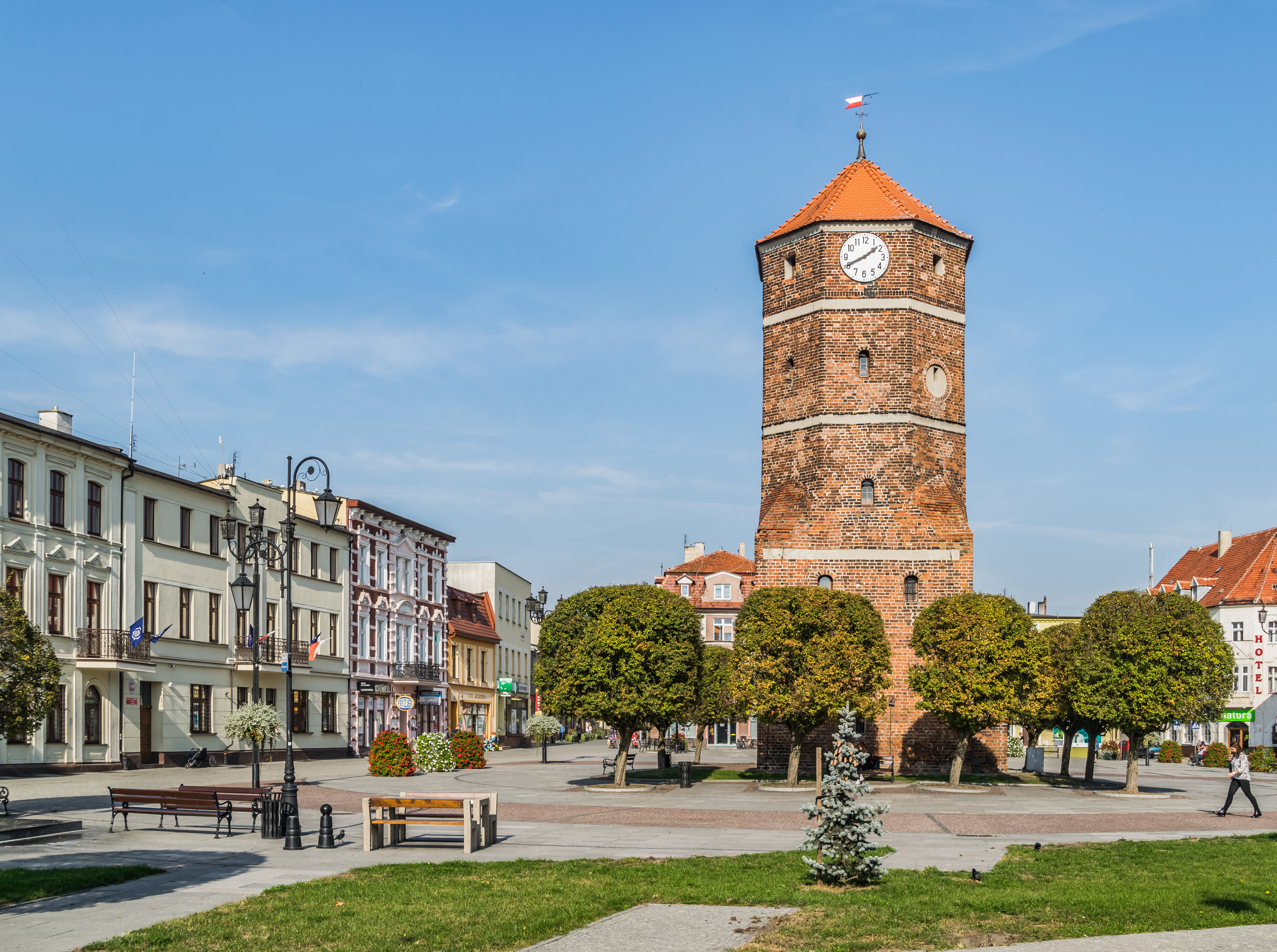
- Market square with the medieval tower of the town hall

- Flag Coat of arms
- Motto: The EPICenter of Poland
- Location within Poland
- Coordinates: 52°51′N 17°42′E
- Country: Poland
- Voivodeship: Kuyavian-Pomeranian
- County: Żnin
- Gmina: Żnin
- Established: 11th century
- Town rights: 1263

Government
  - Mayor: Łukasz Kwiatkowski

Area
  - Total: 8.35 km^{2} (3.22 sq mi)
- Elevation: 85 m (279 ft)

Population (2022)
  - Total: 13,268
  - Density: 1,590/km^{2} (4,120/sq mi)
- Time zone: UTC+1 (CET)
  - Summer (DST): UTC+2 (CEST)
- Postal code: 88-400
- Area code: +48 52
- Car plates: CZN
- Website: gminaznin.pl

Żnin (Polish: [ʐɲin]) is a town in central Poland with a population of 14,181 (June 2014). It is in the Kuyavian-Pomeranian Voivodeship and is the capital of Żnin County.

Established in the 11th century, Żnin is a historical town with a preserved medieval urban layout containing heritage sites in various styles, including Gothic, Baroque, Neoclassical and Neo-Gothic. It is considered the capital of the historic and ethnocultural region of Pałuki, and contains the Museum of the Pałuki Land. Żnin is located in the Greater Poland Lake District on the river Gąsawka between the Żnińskie Duże and Żnińskie Małe lakes.

== Etymology ==
The name originates from the Polish word "żnieja", meaning harvest or a harvester. During World War II, Żnin's name was "Dietfurt".

== History ==
The area was known in Roman times, especially the nearby fortification of Biskupin, a Lusatian culture site known as the "Polish Pompeii". Biskupin was an early Iron Age Hallstatt C fortified settlement of about 800-1000 people in the Warta River valley circa 800-650 and 650-475 BC.

=== Medieval period ===
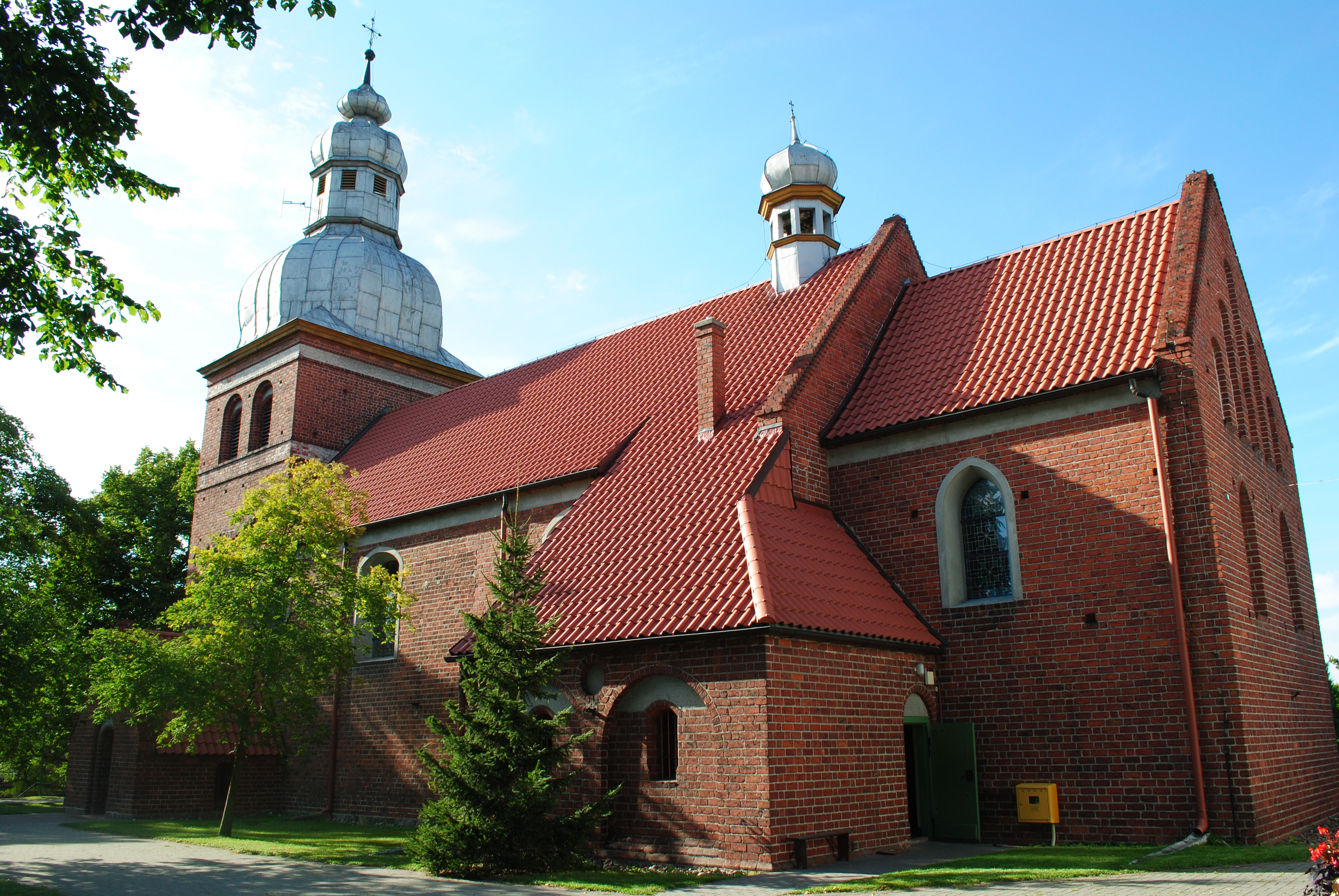
Medieval Gothic Saint Martin church

By 1030, the area was included within the Archbishopric of Gniezno. The first mention of Żnin is in the Gniezno papal bull issued on 7 July 1136 by Pope Innocent II. The pope granted Archbishop Jacob of Żnin 29 villages in Pałuki and the town of Żnin, which also became property of the Roman Catholic Church.

Żnin was given town rights in 1263 (based on Magdeburg law). In the 13th century the town was given the right of coinage, which resulted in its dynamic expansion. Żnin was a major town located on the trade route from Silesia to Gdańsk (the Amber Road). The Teutonic Knights, under command of the Order's Marshal Dietrich von Altenburg, sacked Żnin in 1331. After a few years, the town was rebuilt.

City walls were constructed in 1343. King Casimir the Great of Poland confirmed several privileges and duties to the city and visited it in 1343, 1361, 1365, and 1370. Żnin became a favourite residence of the Gniezno bishops in 1374. In 1447, fire destroyed large parts of the town. In the rebuilt town in 1459, the first wind-mill was constructed, while breweries, orchards, and workshops increased Żnin's prosperity. Another fire destroyed the town in 1494.

=== Modern period ===
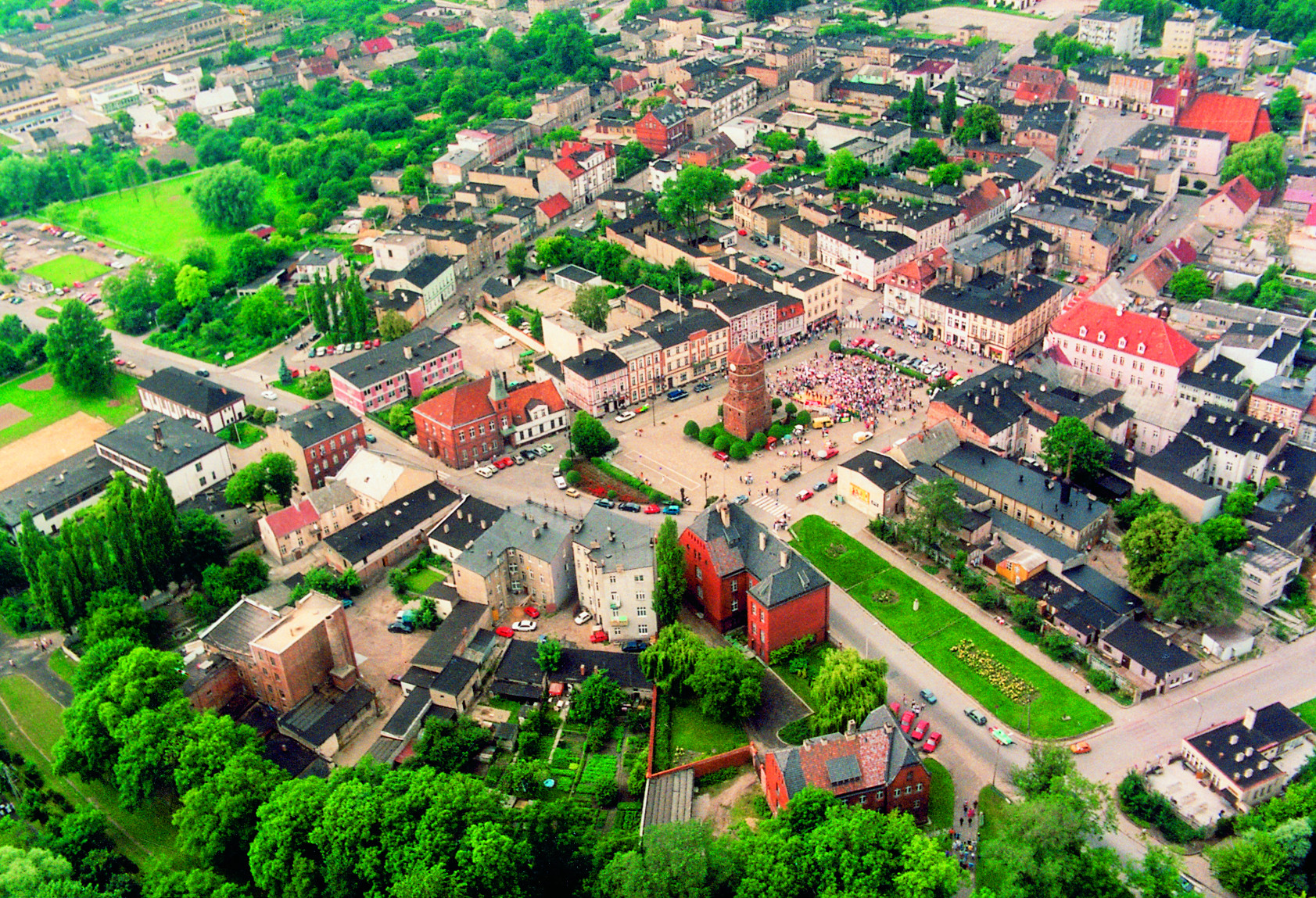
View of the central part of town

Swedish invaders did not attack Żnin during the Deluge (1655–60), but disease and poverty depopulated the town; only 96 building were occupied and 151 buildings were left empty. By 1673, Żnin had 2,331 inhabitants. Fires again damaged Żnin in 1688, 1692, and 1700. People abandoned the town, searching quarters in other nearby towns and villages. After a partial reconstruction, another fire in 1751 destroyed 64 houses, the brewery and the town hall. Only the city-hall tower remained. The medieval part of Żnin constructed of wood was totally destroyed. However, tourists can still admire the historic centre of Żnin and its old structure dating back to the Middle Ages.

Żnin was annexed by the Kingdom of Prussia in 1772 during the First Partition of Poland and subsequently administered within the Netze District. In September 1794, during the unsuccessful Kościuszko Uprising, Polish forces under General Jan Henryk Dąbrowski, passed Gąsawa from Poznań and liberated Żnin. The local garrison commander, Colonel Keszycki, established a recruitment center for volunteers in the town.

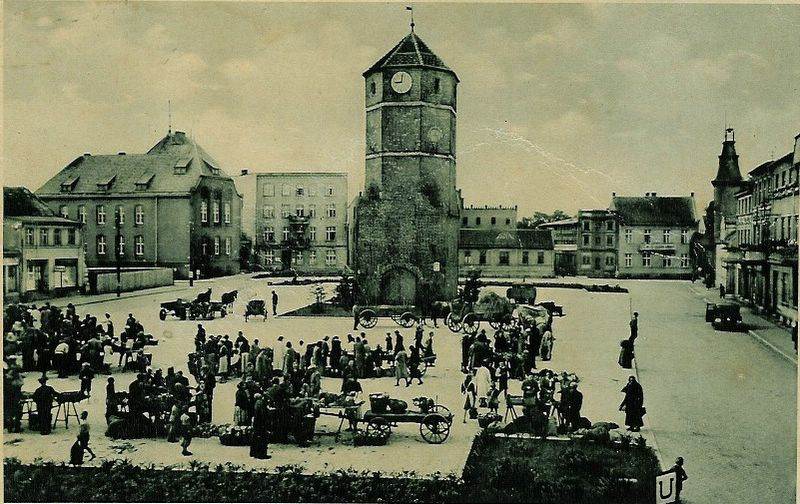
Market square in the early 20th century

After the successful Greater Poland uprising of 1806, it was regained by Poles and included within the short-lived Duchy of Warsaw. With the dissolution of the Duchy of Warsaw in 1815, the town was restored to Prussia and administered within Kreis Schubin within the new Province of Posen. Żnin's economy developed rapidly by the end of the 19th century. By 1902, the town had fresh water pipe lines, gas works, macadam streets, and 4,500 inhabitants.

Żnin participated in the Greater Poland Uprising in January 1919 after World War I. At the time there was a garrison of 300 German soldiers in the city under Sub. Lt. Eckert. The Polish insurgents, supported by a cavalry unit from Gniezno, kept the Germans busy until another unit of 737 came from Poznań and occupied Żnin on 18 January. A new town council was elected and Polish was re-established as the official language. The city had 4,980 inhabitants.

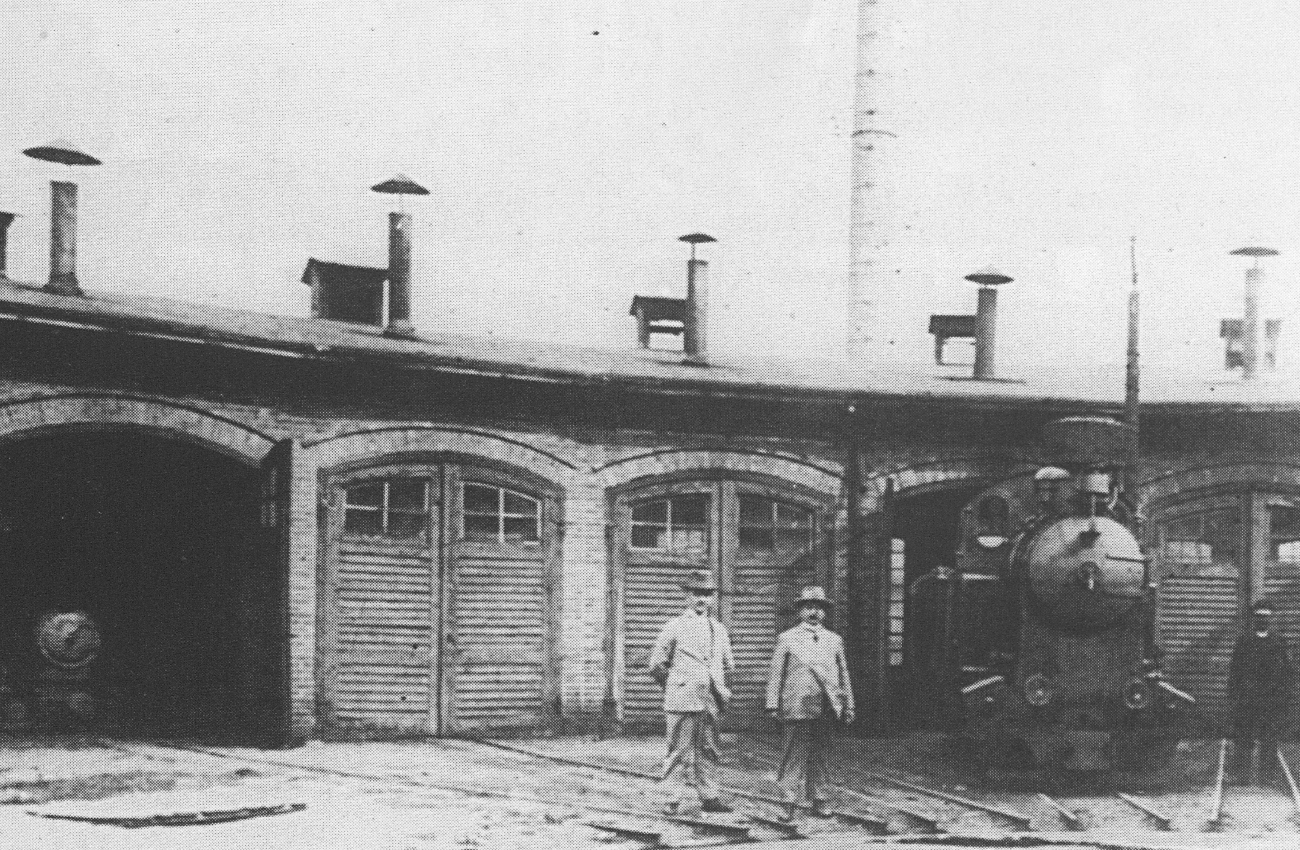
Narrow gauge railway in Żnin in 1930

In 1930, the growing town had 5,500 inhabitants. The processing plants increased their output and agriculture flourished. Żnin had two colleges, three hotels, and, since 1936, a local daily and a weekly newspaper. The county office and court of justice were located in the town.

=== World War II ===
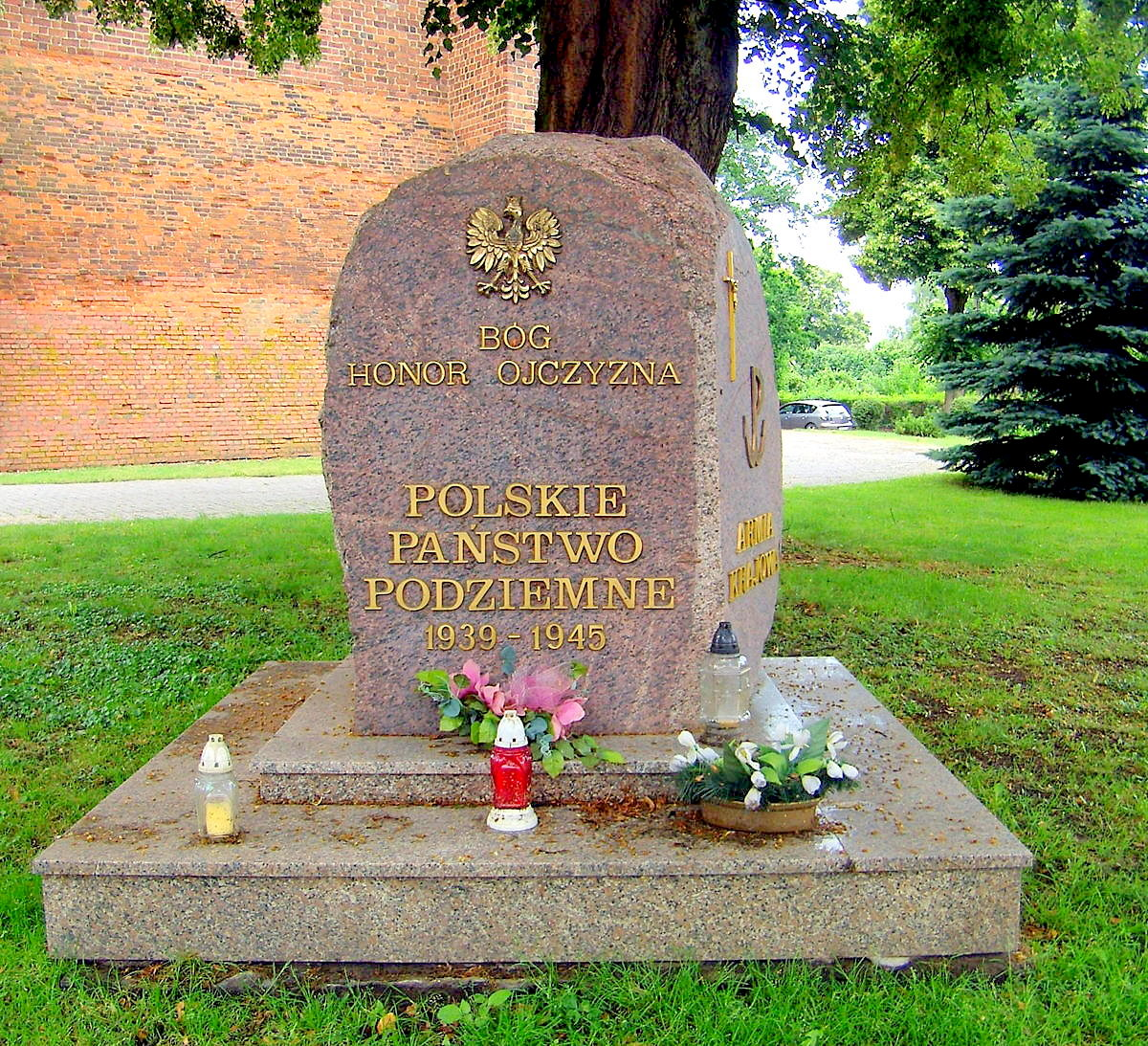
Polish Underground State and Home Army memorial

On 1 September 1939, the first day of World War II, Nazi Germany's Luftwaffe bombed undefended Żnin. Nine days later, German troops marched into the town, which was renamed Dietfurt and administered within Landkreis Dietfurt (Wartheland). All street names were replaced by names of Nazi leaders or German sounding names. There was no school for the Poles; children had to walk to Góra, a village east of Żnin. 600 Poles were deported, with 200 taken to forced labour or Nazi concentration camps. In November and December 1939, hostages, mainly insurgents of 1919, were shot at different places around the town. During the occupation, the Germans also established and operated a Nazi prison in the town.

After the war, on 21 October 1945, a mass re-burial of 62 exhumed victims was held in Gąsawa. In the village Góra (now part of Żnin), a solemn burial of 100 Jewish citizens, killed in the nearby concentration camp Murczyn, was held and a monument created by Żnin craftsmen was unveiled on 11 December 1987.

== Prominent features ==
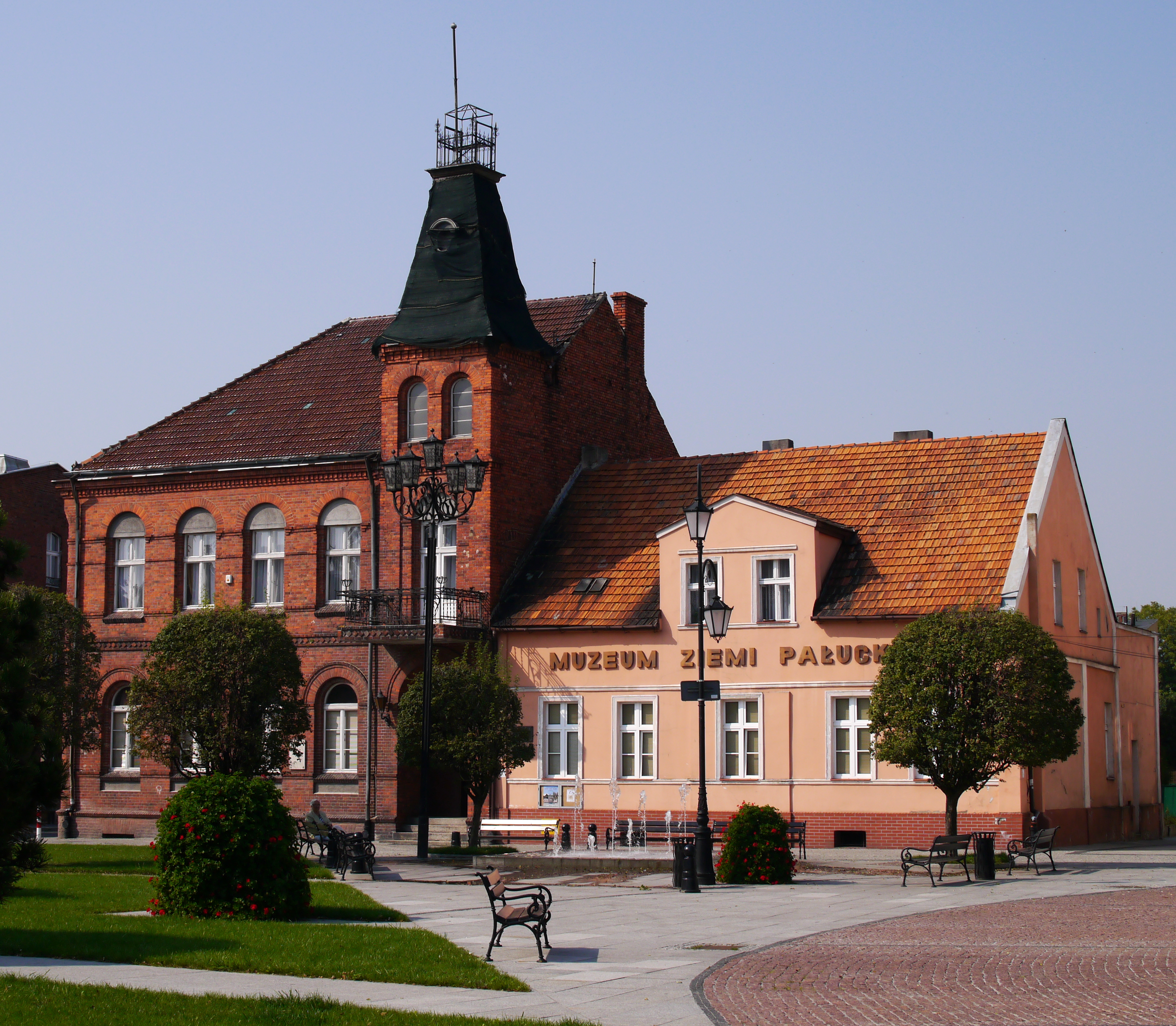
Museum of the Pałuki Land

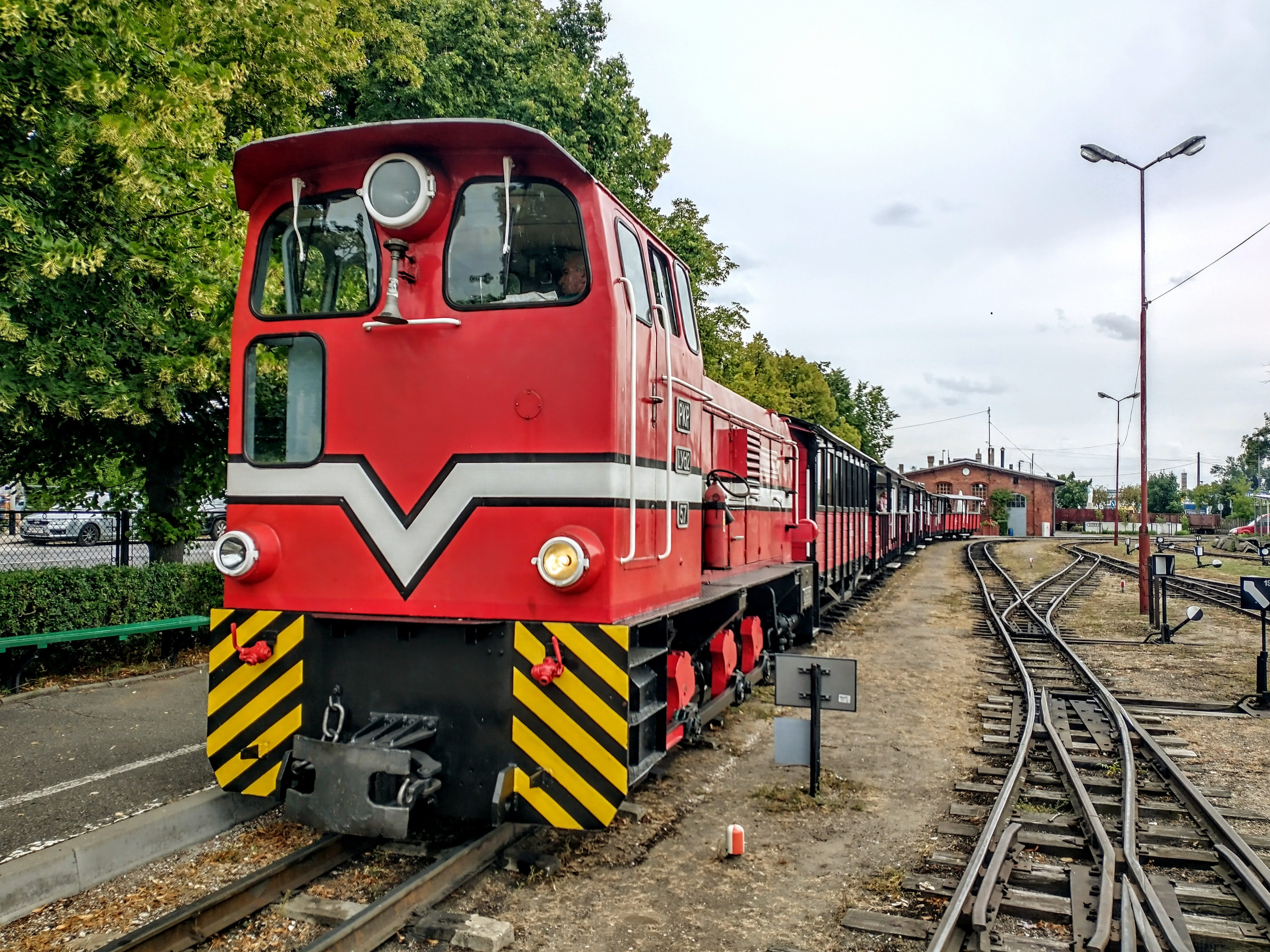
Narrow gauge railway

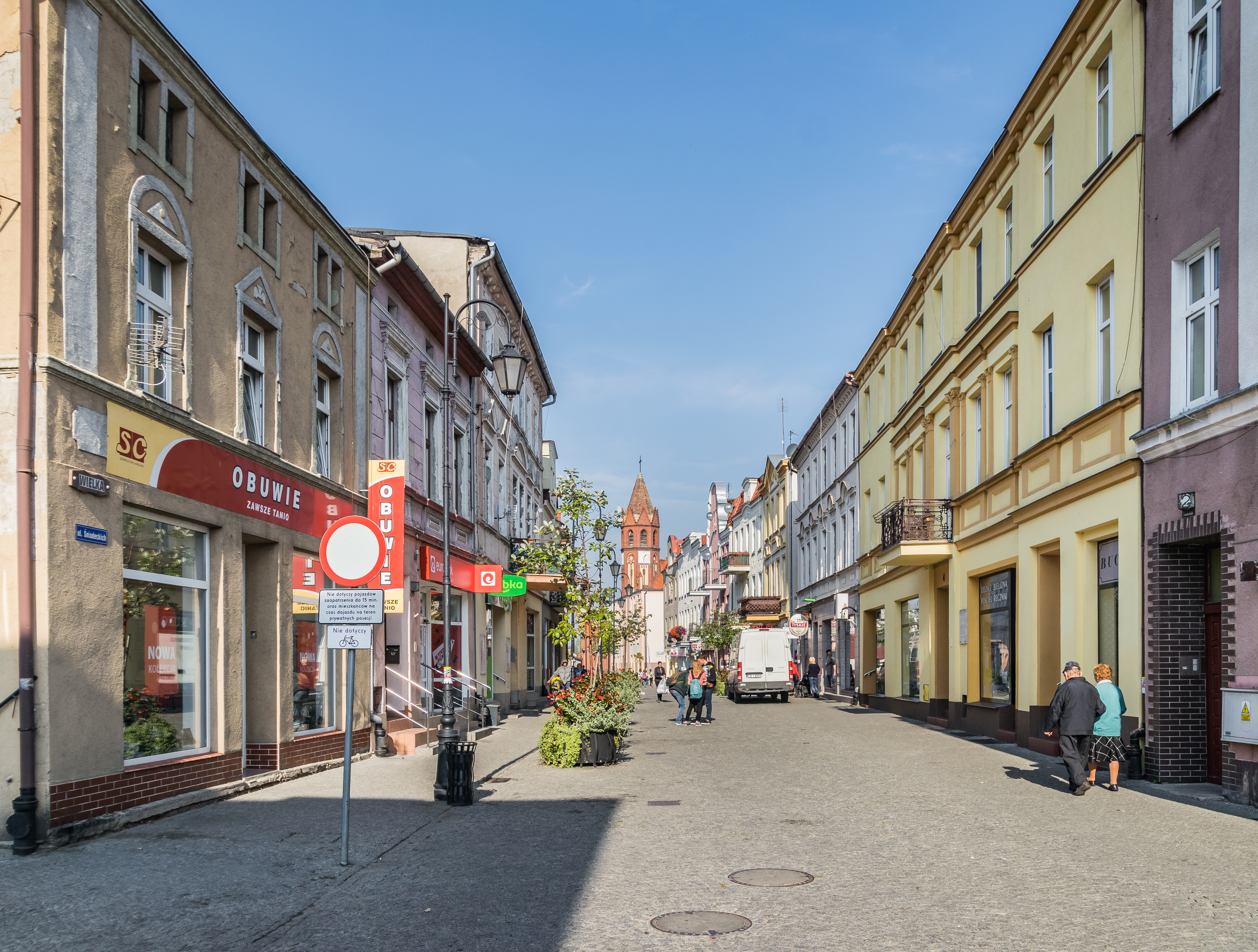
Śniadecki Street in the town center, filled with colourful historic townhouses

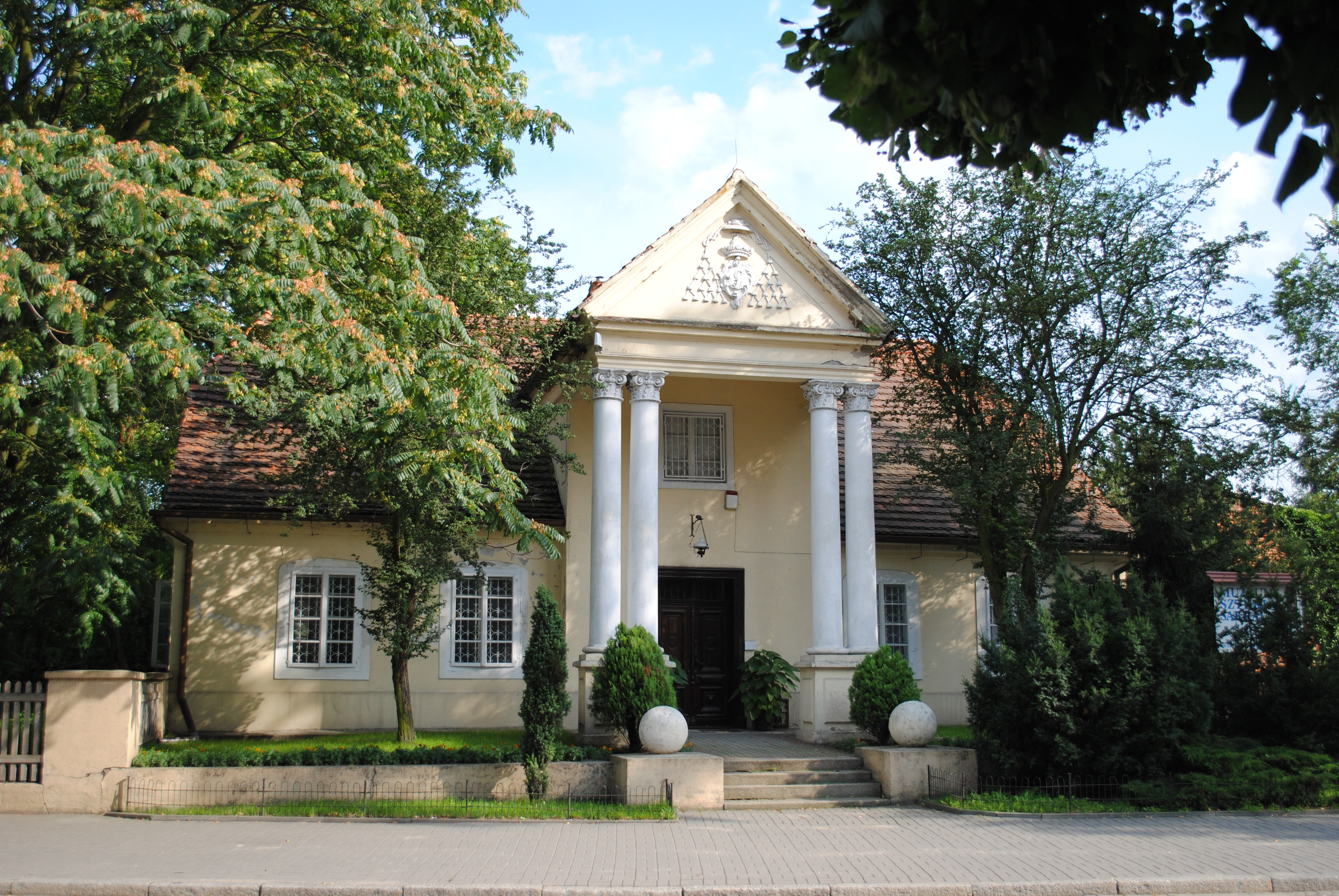
Sufragania

Żnin is located on the Gąsawka river and between two lakes – the Żnin Great Lake and the Żnin Small Lake. Both these and the nearby forests are popular tourist attractions.

Other points of interest include:

- A narrow gauge railway with a locomotive museum down the line at Wenecja
- The ruins of a 14th-century castle
- Churches: (St. Martin's from the 14th century, St. Florian's from the 15th century and Blessed Virgin Mary's from the 19th century)
- Museums: the Archaeological Museum, the Narrow Gauge Railway Museum in Wenecja, the Museum of Sacred Art and the Museum of the Pałuki Land
- A 15th-century Tower (Baszta)
- Sufragania, a former bishop's manor from 1795
- A 19th-century Town Hall (Magistrat at the market square)

== Local events ==
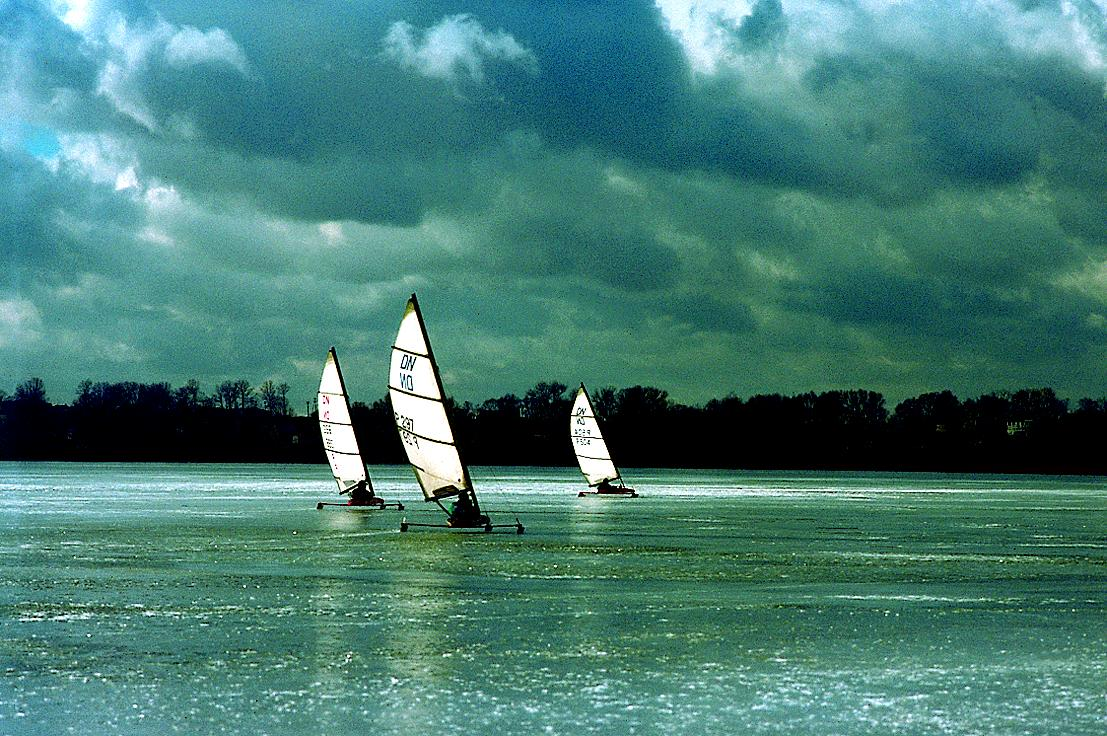
Ice surfing on the Żnin Small Lake

- Tour de Pologne
- World/European Motorboat Championships
- Archaeological Festival in Biskupin
- Folk Authors' Rally "Autumn in the Pałuki Land"
- Pałuki Agricultural Fair
- Tourists' Rallies
- Polish and European Windsurfing Championships

== Notable residents ==
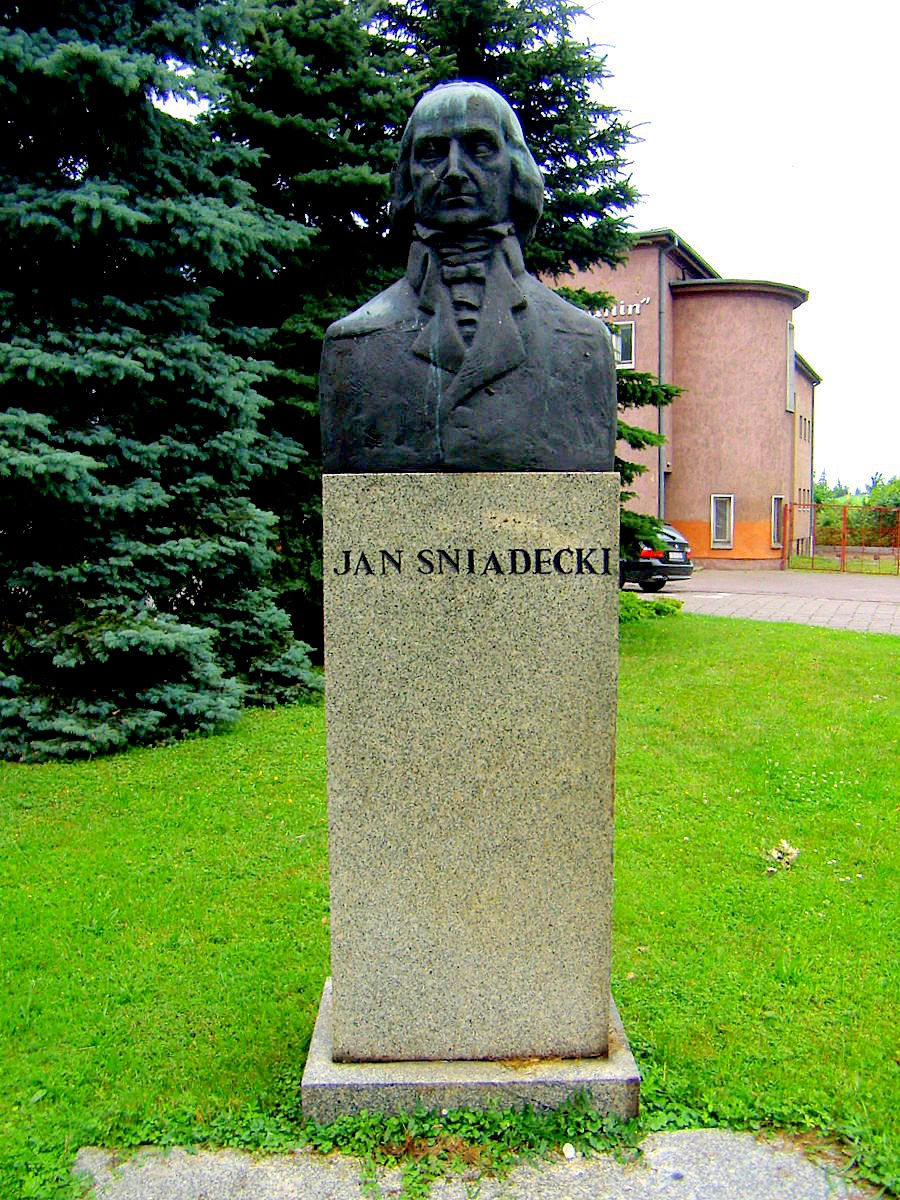
Jan Śniadecki Monument

- Morris Alexander (1877–1946), South African politician
- Franz Arnold (1878–1960), actor and playwright
- Klemens Janicki (1516–1543), poet
- Michał Joachimowski (1950–2014), triple jumper
- Karol Linetty (born 1995), footballer
- Jan Śniadecki (1756–1830), mathematician, philosopher, and astronomer
- Jędrzej Śniadecki (1768–1838), writer, physician, chemist, biologist and philosopher

== Transport links ==
=== By plane ===
Located 45 kilometres (28 miles) to the north of Żnin, the Bydgoszcz Ignacy Jan Paderewski Airport is the nearest one. Once you are in Bydgoszcz (possibly via Warsaw or London), you will need to catch a local bus or taxi to take you into Żnin. There is also the Poznań-Ławica Airport located in Poznań approx. 100 kilometres (62 miles) south-west of Żnin.

=== By bus ===
Several companies dealing with public transport serve Żnin with bus services connecting the town with all major cities of the region (Bydgoszcz, Gniezno, Inowrocław, Poznań, Toruń, Wągrowiec) and also with Wrocław. For bus connections see:

- PKS Bydgoszcz
- PKS Poznań
- PKS Toruń
- PKS Gniezno

=== By car ===
Żnin is served by expressway S5 which runs from Wrocław via Poznań, Gniezno to Bydgoszcz and Świecie. It is about an hour's drive from Bydgoszcz and about 45 minutes drive from Gniezno.

The regional road no. 251 (droga wojewódzka nr 251) running from Inowrocław to Kaliska near to Wągrowiec is another major road connection. It is about 45 minutes drive both from Inowrocław and Wągrowiec.

== International relations ==
=== Twin towns - Sister cities ===
Żnin is twinned with:

| Ommen in Netherlands (since 1991); Mettmann in Germany (since 1997); Veselí nad Moravou in Czech Republic (since 1997); Birštonas in Lithuania (since 1998) | Malacky in Slovakia (since 2001); Šalčininkai in Lithuania (since 2003); Albertirsa in Hungary (since 2005) |
