= Biskupin =

Bronze Age archaeological site in Poland

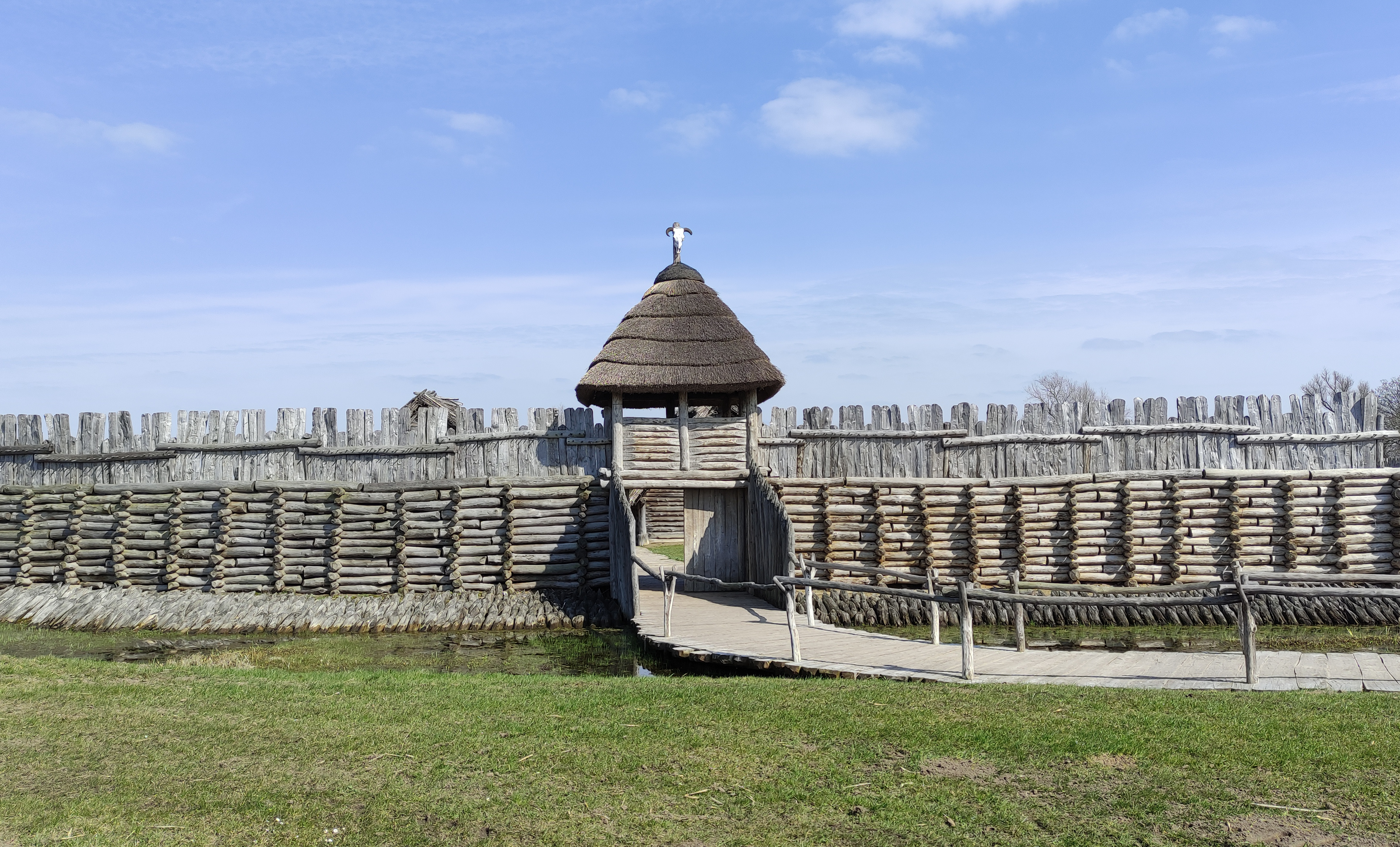
- Reconstructed gateway at Biskupin

- Location within Poland
- 52°47′18″N 17°44′40″E
- Type: Settlement
- Location: Biskupin, Kuyavian-Pomeranian Voivodeship, Poland

History
- Built: c.747–748 BC

Site notes
- Material: Wood
- Condition: In ruins, partially reconstructed

Historic Monument of Poland
- Designated: 1994-09-08
- Reference no.: M.P. z 1994 r. Nr 50, poz. 412

Biskupin (Polish pronunciation: [bisˈkupin]) is an archaeological site and a life-size model of a late Bronze Age fortified settlement in north-central Poland that also serves as an archaeological open-air museum. When first discovered it was thought to be early evidence of a West Slavic settlement, but archaeologists later confirmed it belonged to the Biskupin group of the Lusatian culture from the 8th century BC.

The Museum is situated on a marshy peninsula in Lake Biskupin, c. 90 kilometres (56 miles) northeast of Poznań and 8 km (5 mi) south of the small town of Żnin. In the years 1956–2000, it was a division of the National Museum of Archaeology in Warsaw. After the Polish local government reforms of 1998, Biskupin was granted the status of an independent institution known as the Archaeological Museum in Biskupin.

The site is one of Poland's official national Historic Monuments (Pomnik historii), as designated September 16, 1994, and tracked by the National Heritage Board of Poland. In 2006, Biskupin received a European Heritage Award.

== History of the excavations ==
In 1933, schoolteacher Walenty Szwajcer and his students discovered remains of a Bronze Age fort/settlement in Wielkopolska Region (Greater Poland), and the discovery became famous overnight. The site was excavated from 1934 onwards by the team from Poznań University, led by archaeologists Józef Kostrzewski (1885–1969) and Zdzisław Rajewski (1907–1974). The first report was published in 1936. By the beginning of 1939, ca. 2,500 m^{2} (26,909.78 sq ft) had been excavated. Biskupin soon became famous, attracting numerous distinguished guests, including officials of the Marshal Piłsudski government, members of the military, and high churchmen such as the primate of Poland. The site soon became part of Polish national consciousness, the symbol of achievements of the Slavonic forebears in prehistoric times. It was called the "Polish Pompeii" or "Polish Herculaneum". The existence of a prehistoric fortress, 70 km (43 mi) from the German border, was used to show that the prehistoric "Poles" had held their own against foreign invaders and plunderers as early as the late Bronze Age. Biskupin came to feature in paintings and popular novels.

When the Germans occupied Poland in the autumn of 1939, Biskupin was renamed "Urstädt". In 1940, excavations were resumed by the SS-Ahnenerbe until 1942. When the Germans were forced to retreat they flooded the site hoping to destroy it, but—ironically—it led to very good preservation of the ancient timbers. Excavations were resumed by Polish archaeologists after the war and continued until 1974.

== The site ==
There are two settlement periods at Biskupin, which was located in the middle of a lake but is now situated on a peninsula, that follow each other without a break. Both settlements were laid out on a rectangular grid with eleven streets that are three metres (9.8 ft) wide. The older settlement from the late Bronze Age was established on a slightly wet island of over 2 hectares (4.9 acres) and consisted of around 102-106 oak and pine log-houses that were of similar layout, measuring ca. 8 by 10 metres (26 by 33 feet) each. They consisted of two chambers and an open entrance-area. These houses were designed to accommodate 10–12 persons. An open hearth was located in the centre of the biggest room. There are no larger houses that could indicate social stratification. Because of the damp, boggy ground the streets were covered with wooden planks.

The settlement was surrounded by a tall wooden wall, or palisade, set on a rampart made up of both wood and earth. The rampart was constructed of oak trunks that form boxes filled with earth. The rampart is more than 450 metres (1,480 feet) long and accompanied by a wooden breakwater in the lake. 6,000 to 8,000 cubic metres (210,000 to 280,000 cubic feet) of wood was used in the construction of the rampart.

=== In popular culture ===
The Biskupin archaeological site was featured on stamps issued by the Polish Post in 1966 and 1978.

Anne Michaels' 1996 novel Fugitive Pieces begins at Biskupin, where Athos Roussos, a geologist working on the archaeological site, rescues the then seven year old protagonist, Jakob Beer, who has hidden himself in a nearby bog.

The settlement served as a setting in a number of films including Jerzy Hoffman's 1999 historical drama With Fire and Sword and 2003 historical film An Ancient Tale: When the Sun Was a God.

In August 2018, the Biskupin settlement was celebrated with a Google doodle on the 85th anniversary of the discovery of the site.

== Dating ==
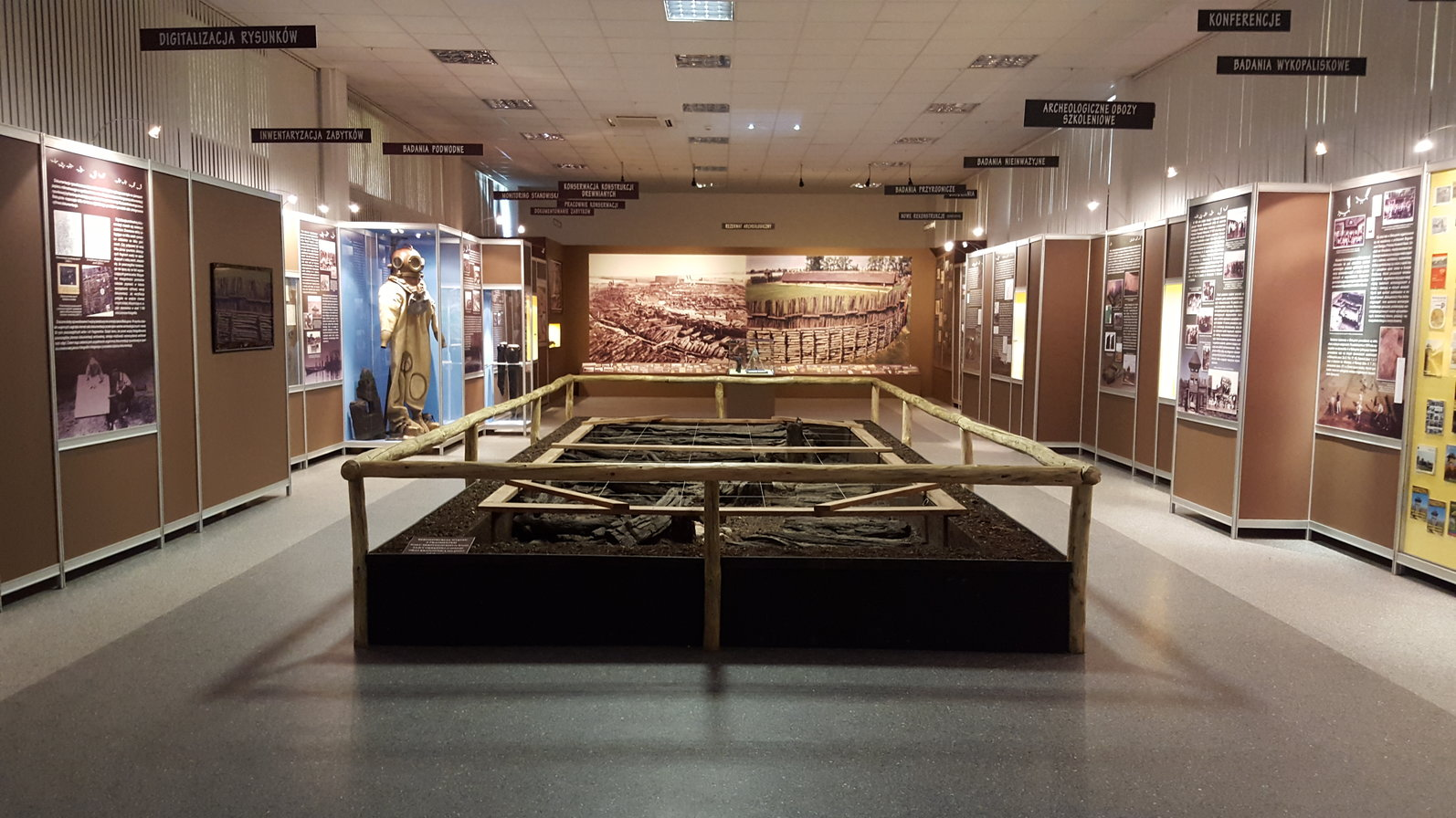
Interior of the Archaeological Museum next to the reconstructed settlement

The settlement at Biskupin belongs to the Hallstatt C and D periods (late Bronze Age/early Iron Age, 800–650 BC and 650–475 BC). There are four radiocarbon dates from Biskupin (all B.C.):

- First settlement: 720±150 (Gif 494)
- Later settlement: 560±150 (Gif 495)
- Rampart: 620±150 (Gif 492)
- A2 4C, VII: 620±150 (Gif 493)

However, dendrochronological analysis provided more accurate dating. It proved that oak wood used in the construction of the settlement was cut down between 747–722 B.C. Over half of the wood used was cut during the winter of 748/747 B.C.

== The model ==
In 1936 the first life-size model (open-air museum) was built on the peninsula, but it was intentionally destroyed by retreating Germans near the end of World War II. After the war it was rebuilt, and the ramparts and one full street with houses on both sides were also added.

In the 2000s, a film prop "medieval" timber castle was constructed on a part of the original site.

== Gallery ==
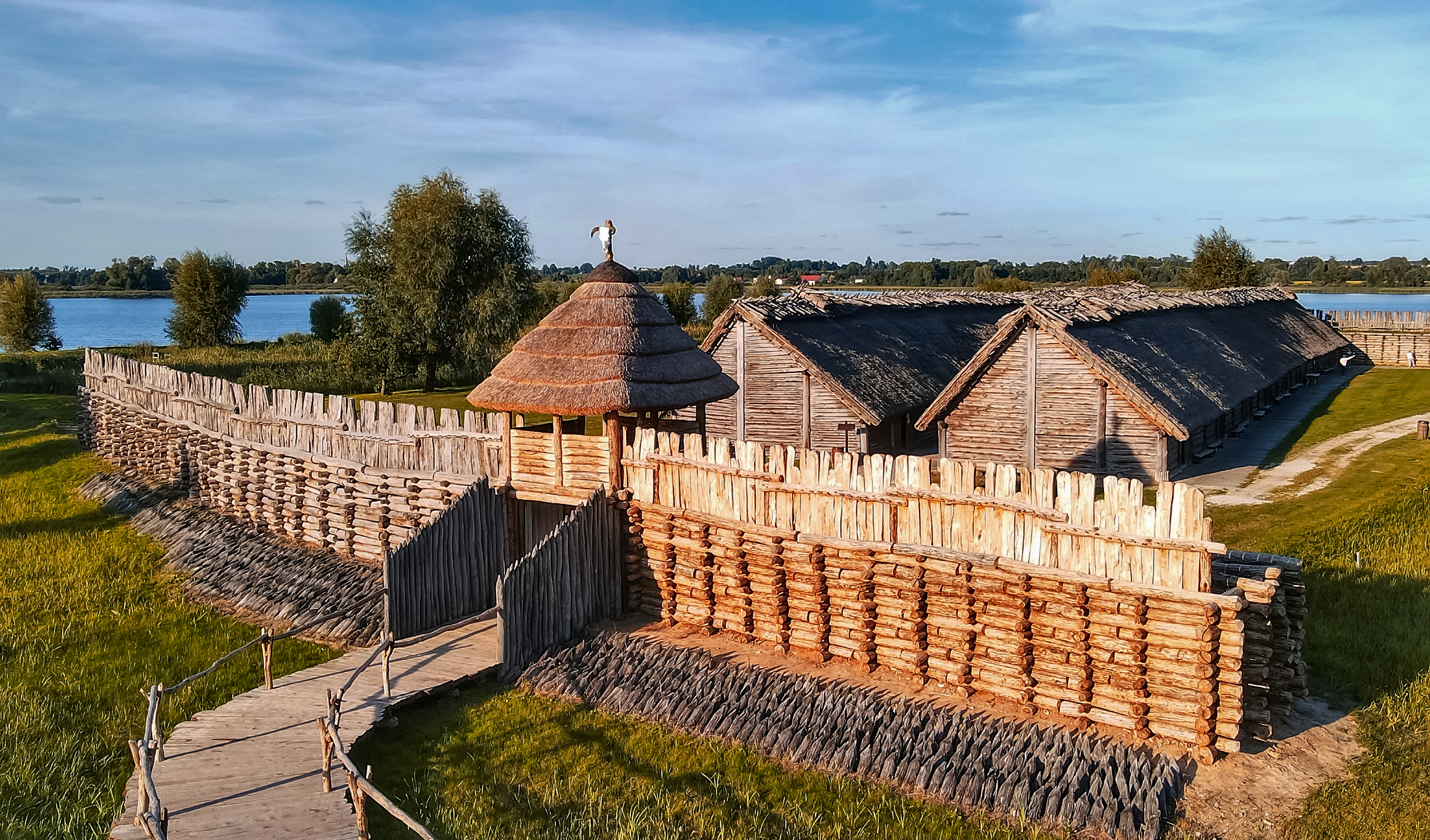
Reconstruction of the settlement

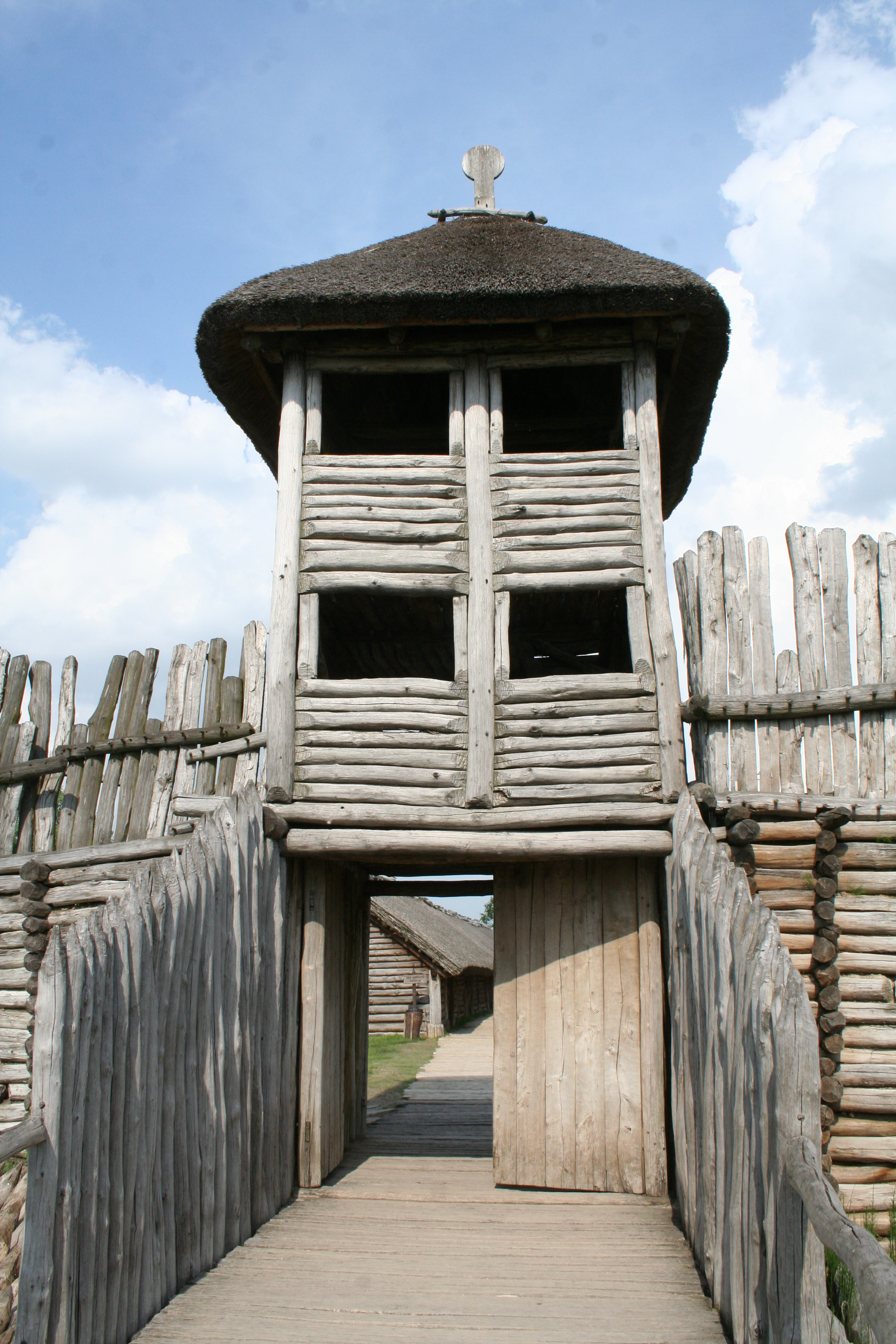
Reconstructed entrance gate

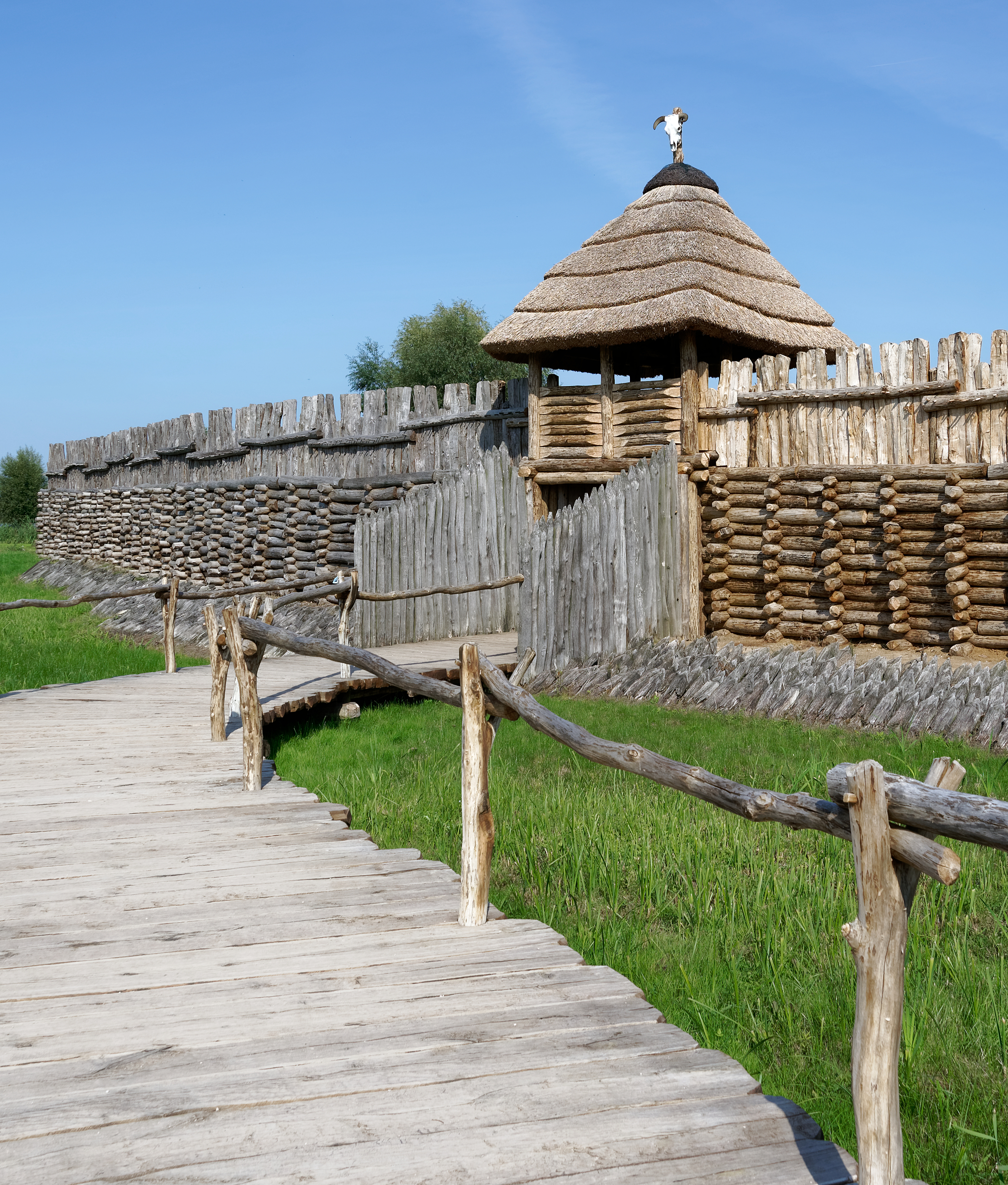
Most recent gate and wall

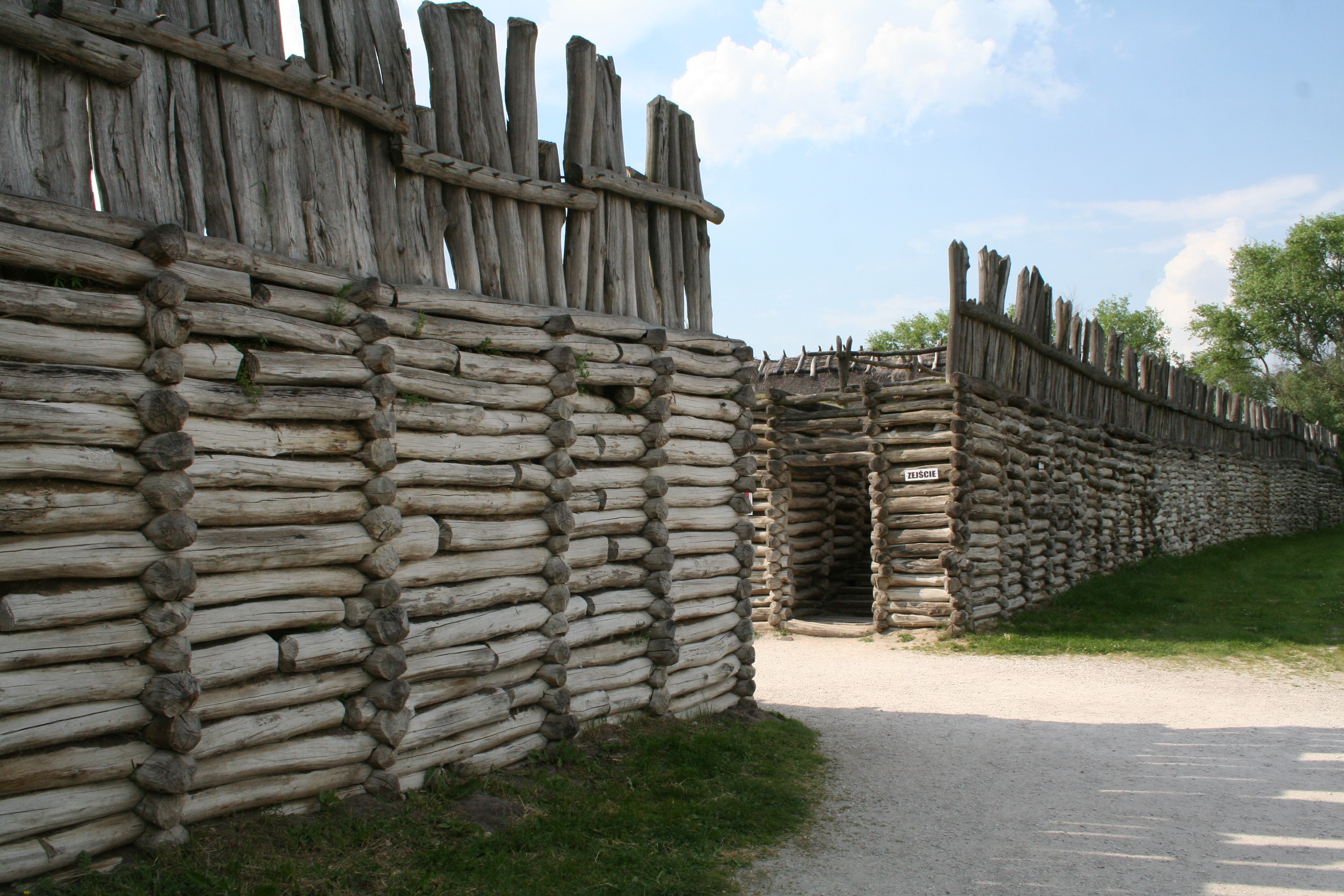
Reconstructed walls

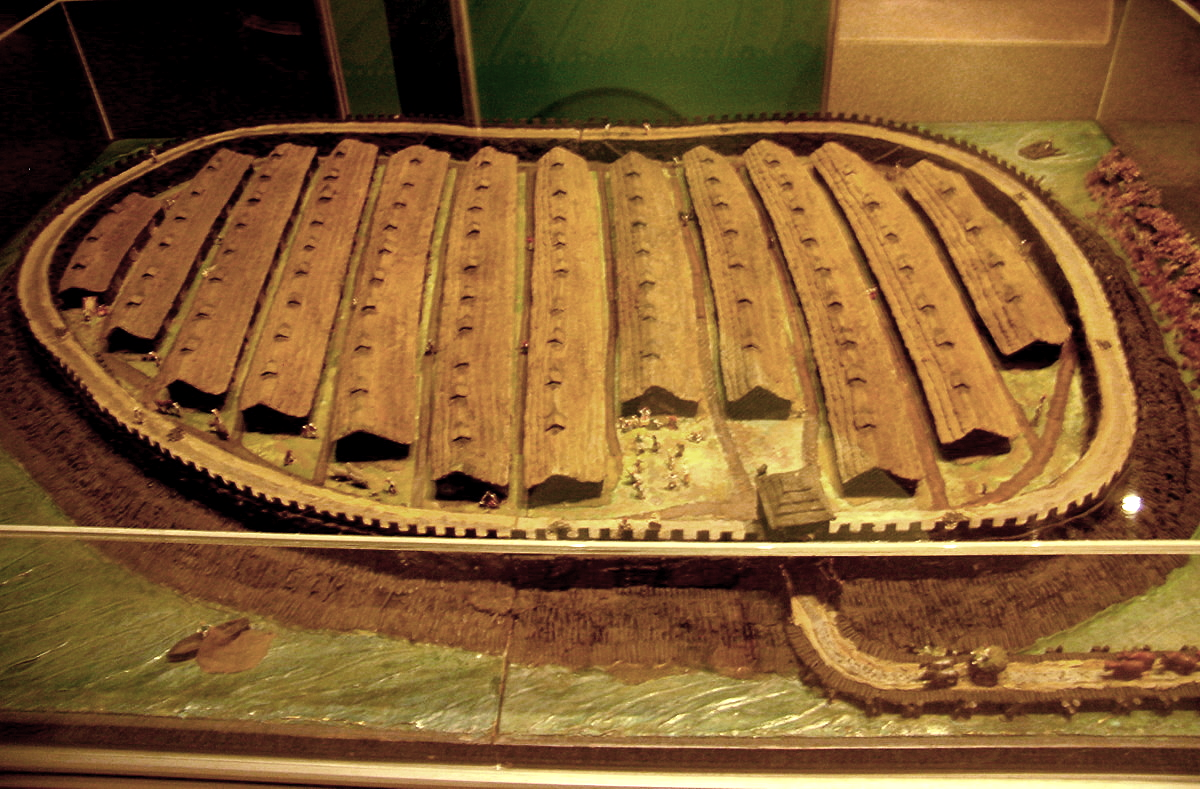
Model of the Bronze Age settlement

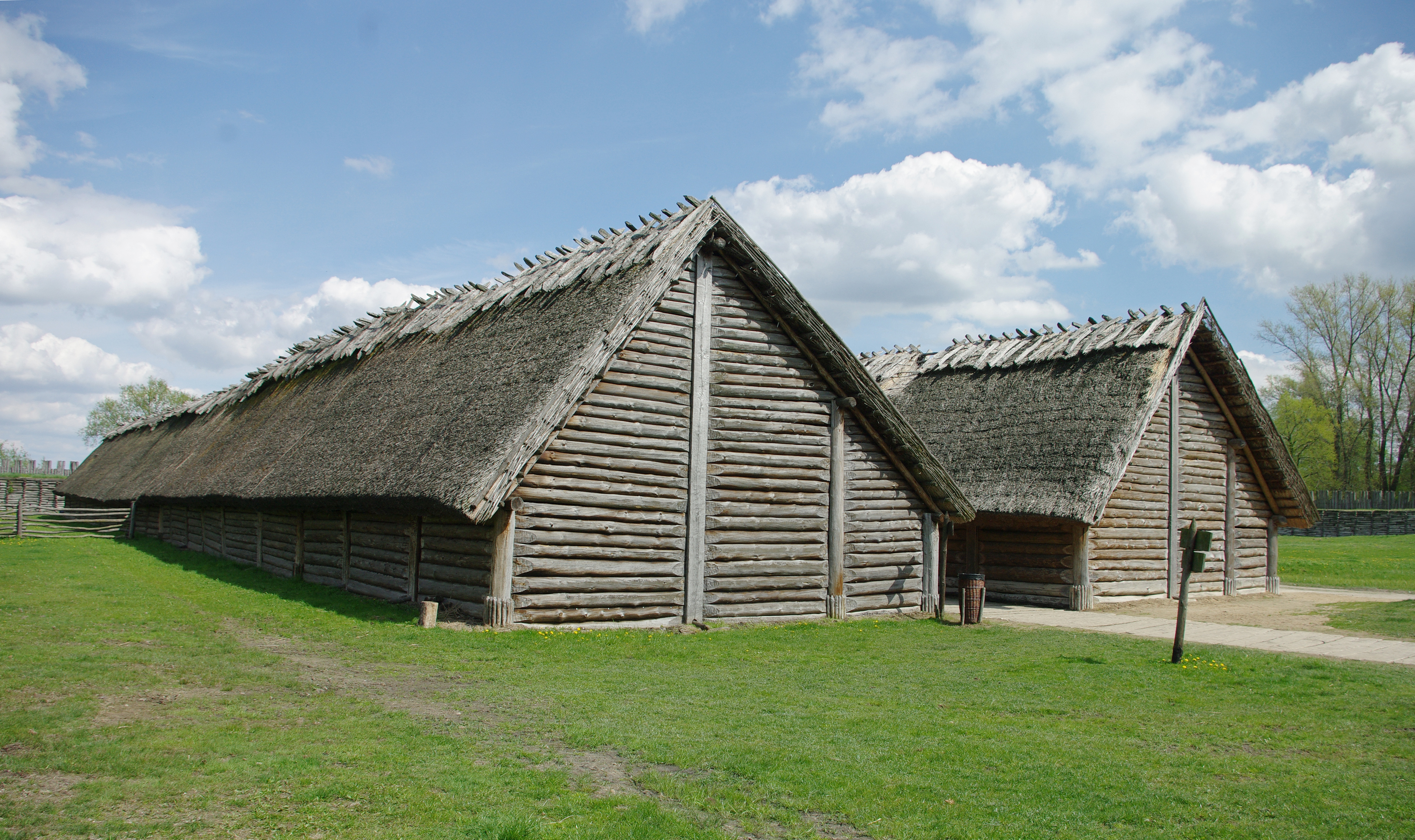
Reconstructed huts

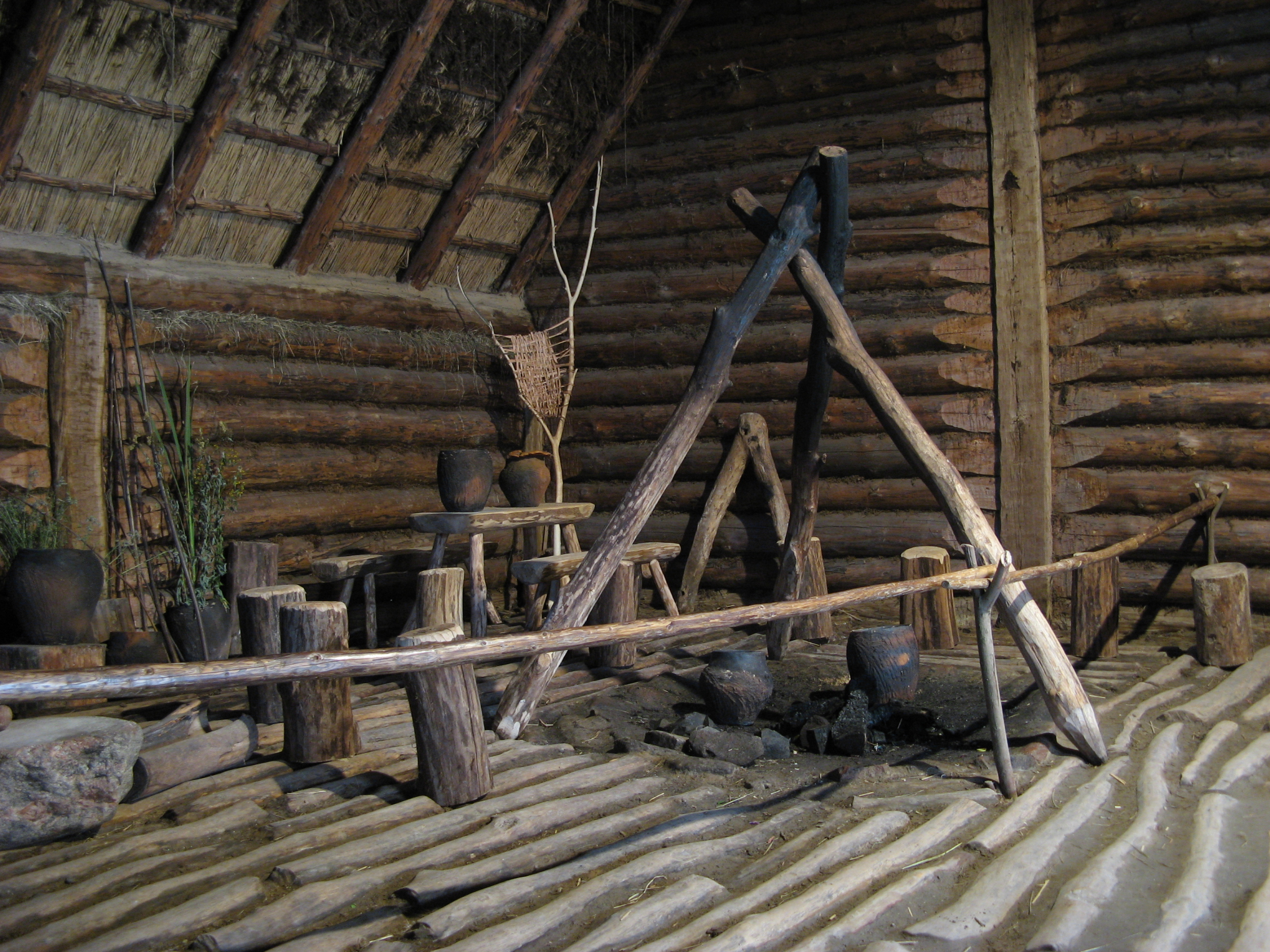
The interior of a hut

== See also ==
- Castles in Poland
