= Jeleń, West Pomeranian Voivodeship =

Jeleń
- Village
- Location within Poland
- Coordinates: 53°37′N 16°36′E
- Country: Poland
- Voivodeship: West Pomeranian
- County: Szczecinek
- Gmina: Borne Sulinowo

Jeleń [ˈjɛlɛɲ] (German: Gellen) is a village in the administrative district of Gmina Borne Sulinowo, within Szczecinek County, West Pomeranian Voivodeship, in north-western Poland. It lies approximately 6 km (4 mi) north-east of Borne Sulinowo, 13 km (8 mi) south-west of Szczecinek, and 136 km (85 mi) east of the regional capital Szczecin.

== See also ==
History of Pomerania
