= Osiczyn =

- Village
- Location within Poland
- Coordinates: 53°37′40″N 16°28′24″E
- Country: Poland
- Voivodeship: West Pomeranian
- County: Szczecinek
- Gmina: Borne Sulinowo
- Population: 40

Osiczyn [ɔˈɕit͡ʂɨn] (German: Neuhof) is a village in the administrative district of Gmina Borne Sulinowo, within Szczecinek County, West Pomeranian Voivodeship, in north-western Poland. It lies approximately 7 km (4 mi) north-west of Borne Sulinowo, 18 km (11 mi) south-west of Szczecinek, and 128 km (80 mi) east of the regional capital Szczecin.

For the history of the region, see History of Pomerania.

The village has a population of 40.
