= Krągi =

- Village
- Location within Poland
- Coordinates: 53°36′N 16°34′E
- Country: Poland
- Voivodeship: West Pomeranian
- County: Szczecinek
- Gmina: Borne Sulinowo
- Population (approx.): 400

Krągi [ˈkrɔnɡi] (formerly German Krangen) is a village in the administrative district of Gmina Borne Sulinowo, within Szczecinek County, West Pomeranian Voivodeship, in north-western Poland. It lies approximately 4 km (2 mi) north-east of Borne Sulinowo, 16 km (10 mi) south-west of Szczecinek, and 133 km (83 mi) east of the regional capital Szczecin.

Before 1648 the area was part of Duchy of Pomerania and in 1648–1945 part of Prussia and Germany. For the history of the region, see History of Pomerania.

The village has an approximate population of 400.
