= Dąbrowica, Szczecinek County =

Dąbrowica
- Village
- Location within Poland
- Coordinates: 53°36′21″N 16°31′57″E
- Country: Poland
- Voivodeship: West Pomeranian
- County: Szczecinek
- Gmina: Borne Sulinowo
- Population: 30

Dąbrowica [dɔmbrɔˈvit͡sa] (German: Dummerfitz) is a village in the administrative district of Gmina Borne Sulinowo, within Szczecinek County, West Pomeranian Voivodeship, in north-western Poland. It lies approximately 3 km (2 mi) north of Borne Sulinowo, 16 km (10 mi) south-west of Szczecinek, and 131 km (81 mi) east of the regional capital Szczecin.

The settlement was founded around 1500 in forest clearing and colonization initiated by local noble families of Wolde and Glasenapp to attract German settlers.

Before 1648 the area was part of Duchy of Pomerania, 1648-1945 Prussia and Germany. For the history of the region, see History of Pomerania.

The village has a population of 30.
