= Czochryń =

- Village
- Location within Poland
- Coordinates: 53°32′3″N 16°28′5″E
- Country: Poland
- Voivodeship: West Pomeranian
- County: Szczecinek
- Gmina: Borne Sulinowo
- Population: 10

Czochryń [ˈt͡ʂɔxrɨɲ] is a village in the administrative district of Gmina Borne Sulinowo, within Szczecinek County, West Pomeranian Voivodeship, in north-western Poland. It lies approximately 7 km (4 mi) south-west of Borne Sulinowo, 25 km (16 mi) south-west of Szczecinek, and 126 km (78 mi) east of the regional capital Szczecin.

Before 1648 the area was part of Duchy of Pomerania, 1648-1945 Prussia and Germany. For the history of the region, see History of Pomerania.

The village has a population of 10.
