= Liszkowo, Szczecinek County =

Liszkowo
- Village
- Location within Poland
- Coordinates: 53°35′N 16°27′E
- Country: Poland
- Voivodeship: West Pomeranian
- County: Szczecinek
- Gmina: Borne Sulinowo

Liszkowo [liʂˈkɔvɔ] (formerly German Altenwalde) is a village in the administrative district of Gmina Borne Sulinowo, within Szczecinek County, West Pomeranian Voivodeship, in north-western Poland. It lies approximately 6 km (4 mi) west of Borne Sulinowo, 22 km (14 mi) south-west of Szczecinek, and 125 km (78 mi) east of the regional capital Szczecin.

Before 1648 the area was part of Duchy of Pomerania, 1648-1945 Prussia and Germany. For the history of the region, see History of Pomerania.
