= Kolanowo =

- Village
- Location within Poland
- Coordinates: 53°41′27″N 16°23′9″E
- Country: Poland
- Voivodeship: West Pomeranian
- County: Szczecinek
- Gmina: Borne Sulinowo
- Population: 30

Kolanowo [kɔlaˈnɔvɔ] (German: Knick) is a village in the administrative district of Gmina Borne Sulinowo, within Szczecinek County, West Pomeranian Voivodeship, in north-western Poland. It lies approximately 16 km (10 mi) north-west of Borne Sulinowo, 20 km (12 mi) west of Szczecinek, and 124 km (77 mi) east of the regional capital Szczecin.

The village has a population of 30.

== See also ==
- History of Pomerania
