= Dąbie, Szczecinek County =

Dąbie
- Village
- Location within Poland
- Coordinates: 53°40′N 16°26′E
- Country: Poland
- Voivodeship: West Pomeranian
- County: Szczecinek
- Gmina: Borne Sulinowo

Dąbie [ˈdɔmbjɛ] (German: Eichenberg) is a village in the administrative district of Gmina Borne Sulinowo, within Szczecinek County, West Pomeranian Voivodeship, in north-western Poland. It lies approximately 12 km (7 mi) north-west of Borne Sulinowo, 18 km (11 mi) west of Szczecinek, and 126 km (78 mi) east of the regional capital Szczecin.

== See also ==
History of Pomerania
