= Kiełpino, Szczecinek County =

Kiełpino
- Village
- Location within Poland
- Coordinates: 53°41′N 16°25′E
- Country: Poland
- Voivodeship: West Pomeranian
- County: Szczecinek
- Gmina: Borne Sulinowo
- Population (approx.): 100

Kiełpino [kʲɛu̯ˈpinɔ] (German: Kölpin) is a village in the administrative district of Gmina Borne Sulinowo, within Szczecinek County, West Pomeranian Voivodeship, in north-western Poland. It lies approximately 14 km (9 mi) north-west of Borne Sulinowo, 18 km (11 mi) west of Szczecinek, and 125 km (78 mi) east of the regional capital Szczecin.

For the history of the region, see History of Pomerania.

The village has an approximate population of 100.
