= Obrąb, West Pomeranian Voivodeship =

Obrąb
- Settlement
- Location within Poland
- Coordinates: 53°41′45″N 16°29′18″E
- Country: Poland
- Voivodeship: West Pomeranian
- County: Szczecinek
- Gmina: Borne Sulinowo

Obrąb [ˈɔbrɔmp] (German: Bramstädt) is a settlement in the administrative district of Gmina Borne Sulinowo, within Szczecinek County, West Pomeranian Voivodeship, in north-western Poland. It lies approximately 14 km (9 mi) north of Borne Sulinowo, 14 km (9 mi) west of Szczecinek, and 130 km (81 mi) east of the regional capital Szczecin.

For the history of the region, see History of Pomerania.
