= Starowice =

Starowice may refer to the following places in Poland:

- Starowice, Nysa County in Opole Voivodeship (south-west Poland)
- Starowice, West Pomeranian Voivodeship (north-west Poland)
