= Zamęcie, Gmina Borne Sulinowo =

Zamęcie
- Settlement
- Location within Poland
- Coordinates: 53°40′5″N 16°31′58″E
- Country: Poland
- Voivodeship: West Pomeranian
- County: Szczecinek
- Gmina: Borne Sulinowo

Zamęcie [zaˈmɛnt͡ɕɛ] (German: Neumühl) is a settlement in the administrative district of Gmina Borne Sulinowo, within Szczecinek County, West Pomeranian Voivodeship, in north-western Poland. It lies approximately 10 km (6 mi) north of Borne Sulinowo, 12 km (7 mi) south-west of Szczecinek, and 132 km (82 mi) east of the regional capital Szczecin.

For the history of the region, see History of Pomerania.
