= Okole, Szczecinek County =

Okole
- Village
- Location within Poland
- Coordinates: 53°39′21″N 16°23′57″E
- Country: Poland
- Voivodeship: West Pomeranian
- County: Szczecinek
- Gmina: Borne Sulinowo
- Population: 23

Okole [ɔˈkɔlɛ] is a village in the administrative district of Gmina Borne Sulinowo, within Szczecinek County, West Pomeranian Voivodeship, in north-western Poland. It lies approximately 13 km (8 mi) north-west of Borne Sulinowo, 20 km (12 mi) west of Szczecinek, and 124 km (77 mi) east of the regional capital Szczecin.

Before 1648 the area was part of Duchy of Pomerania, 1648-1945 Prussia and Germany. For the history of the region, see History of Pomerania.

The village has a population of 23.
