= Międzylesie, West Pomeranian Voivodeship =

Międzylesie
- Settlement
- Location within Poland
- Coordinates: 53°37′13″N 16°26′31″E
- Country: Poland
- Voivodeship: West Pomeranian
- County: Szczecinek
- Gmina: Borne Sulinowo

Międzylesie [mjɛnd͡zɨˈlɛɕɛ] (German: Gut Alt Bärbaum) is a settlement in the administrative district of Gmina Borne Sulinowo, within Szczecinek County, West Pomeranian Voivodeship, in north-western Poland. It lies approximately 8 km (5 mi) north-west of Borne Sulinowo, 20 km (12 mi) south-west of Szczecinek, and 126 km (78 mi) east of the regional capital Szczecin.

Before 1648 the area was part of Duchy of Pomerania, 1648-1945 Prussia and Germany. For the history of the region, see History of Pomerania.
