= Przyjezierze, Szczecinek County =

Przyjezierze
- Village
- Location within Poland
- Coordinates: 53°38′11″N 16°36′45″E
- Country: Poland
- Voivodeship: West Pomeranian
- County: Szczecinek
- Gmina: Borne Sulinowo
- Population: 70

Przyjezierze [pʂɨjɛˈʑɛʐɛ] is a village in the administrative district of Gmina Borne Sulinowo, within Szczecinek County, West Pomeranian Voivodeship, in north-western Poland. It lies approximately 9 km (6 mi) north-east of Borne Sulinowo, 11 km (7 mi) south-west of Szczecinek, and 137 km (85 mi) east of the regional capital Szczecin.

For the history of the region, see History of Pomerania.

The village has a population of 70.
