= Strzeszyn =

Strzeszyn may refer to the following places:

- Strzeszyn, Poznań, a neighbourhood in the city of Poznań
- Strzeszyn, Lesser Poland Voivodeship (south Poland)
- Strzeszyn, Pomeranian Voivodeship (north Poland)
- Strzeszyn, Gmina Borne Sulinowo in West Pomeranian Voivodeship (north-west Poland)
- Strzeszyn, Gmina Grzmiąca in West Pomeranian Voivodeship (north-west Poland)
