= Kądzielnia =

- Settlement
- Location within Poland
- Coordinates: 53°40′22″N 16°35′4″E
- Country: Poland
- Voivodeship: West Pomeranian
- County: Szczecinek
- Gmina: Borne Sulinowo

Kądzielnia [kɔnˈd͡ʑɛlɲa] (German: before 1939 Schneidemühl bei Juchow, 1939 Spee) is a settlement in the administrative district of Gmina Borne Sulinowo, within Szczecinek County, West Pomeranian Voivodeship, in north-western Poland. It lies approximately 11 km (7 mi) north of Borne Sulinowo, 9 km (6 mi) south-west of Szczecinek, and 136 km (85 mi) east of the regional capital Szczecin.

For the history of the region, see History of Pomerania.
