= Kłomino =

- Ghost Town
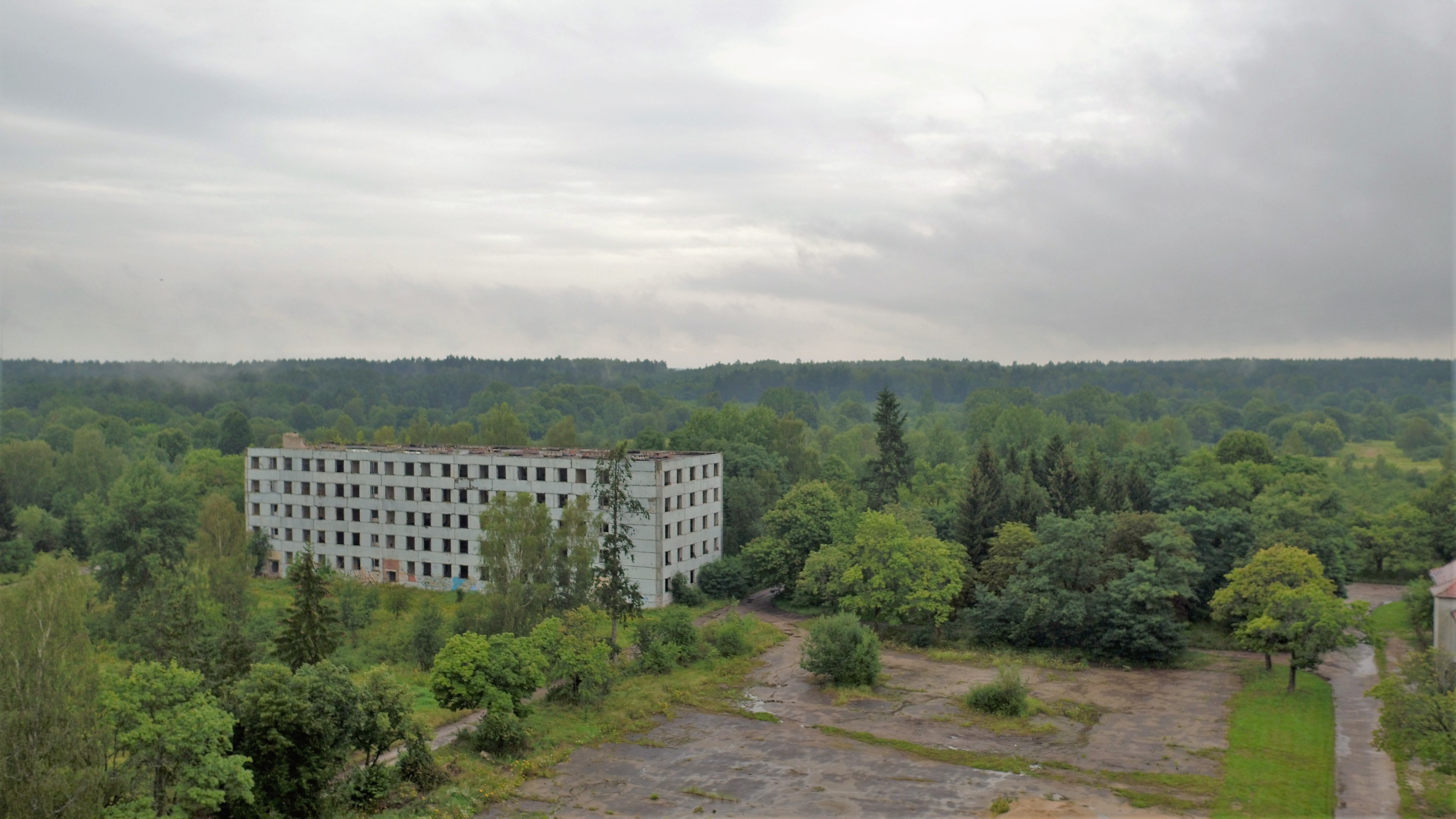
- Abandoned tower block in Kłomino

- Location within Poland
- Coordinates: 53°29′04″N 16°32′58″E
- Country: Poland
- Voivodeship: West Pomeranian
- County: Szczecinek
- Gmina: Borne Sulinowo

Area
  - Total: 0.8278 km^{2} (0.3196 sq mi)

Population
  - Estimate (2012): 12
- Time zone: UTC+1 (CET)
  - Summer (DST): UTC+2 (CEST)
- Vehicle registration: ZSZ

Kłomino (German: Westfalenhof) is a ghost town in Poland, in Szczecinek County, West Pomeranian Voivodeship. In the past it was a large garrison and a training ground of the German Wehrmacht. After World War II, it was a base of the Soviet Army, and for many years it existed only on Soviet military maps. Since 1993, when the Red Army withdrew its forces from Poland, it has lain empty. Until 1992, there were 5,000 residents in Kłomino, today it is a ghost town. As of 2012, Kłomino had 12 residents. The town is located about 12 kilometres (7 miles) away from Borne Sulinowo.

== History ==
The territory became a part of the emerging Polish state under its first historic ruler Mieszko I in the 10th century. It formed part of the Wałcz County in the Poznań Voivodeship in the Greater Poland Province until the First Partition of Poland in 1772, when it was annexed by Prussia, and from 1871 it was also part of Germany. Kłomino, located in a sparsely populated and densely wooded area of former German province of Pomerania, in the early 20th century was a little village known as Westfalenhof. In the 1930s, the Wehrmacht planners built a large military base here, together with a training ground. According to the Polish edition of Newsweek, in 1939 some 60,000 military personnel resided in Westfalenhof's barracks.

In the autumn of 1939, after the Polish September Campaign, the Germans opened a prisoner-of-war camp here, in which in November 1939 there were some 6,000 Polish soldiers, as well as around 2,300 Polish civilians, arrested by the Wehrmacht during the invasion. In June 1940, the camp was named Oflag II D Gross-Born, and soon afterwards, French Army officers were brought to it in such numbers that in early 1941 there were 3731 of them. Later on, the number of French prisoners decreased, and they were replaced with Polish POWs, brought from other camps.

Westfalenhof was captured by the advancing Red Army in January 1945, and after World War II it remained in Soviet hands, as a military base. Even though officially part of the People's Republic of Poland, it was de facto a Soviet Union territory, and Poles were not allowed to enter the town. Renamed Grodek, the village was not shown on Polish maps. Around 6,000 Soviet soldiers lived there, and the parts of the former German base which were not needed any more were razed to the ground by the Red Army servicemen. The debris was sent to Warsaw, to help rebuild the destroyed city.

After the collapse of the Soviet Union, Russia pulled out in 1993. The derelict village became one of hundreds of former military installations in countries of the former Eastern Bloc — Poland, the Czech Republic, Slovakia and Hungary. Grodek got a new, Polish name — Kłomino. For around a year, the village was guarded by the Polish Army, then it was transferred to the civilian authorities.

Since Russia withdrew, Polish officials have been trying to figure out what to do with the village. It was on the market, priced at 2 million euros. The www.propertyshowrooms.com webpage advertisement described Kłomino as:

Complete ex-Soviet military village capacity for over 1,000 families, 82.78 ha of land with its own lake and barrack style buildings, 11 buildings in varying condition including a firing range and canteen. Nearest town 4 km. Offers invited around 2 million euros. Only partial information available as costs will vary depending on type of project proposed and subsequent EU subsidy availability.

However, nobody was willing to purchase the village and too few people decided to settle there. Local authorities, for lack of funds, left Kłomino abandoned. The Nazi- and Soviet-era buildings have been abandoned and now the only sign that remains of the town's "glory" is the last wall of a collapsed movie theatre adorned with colourful Soviet propaganda.

There were several suggestions what to do with Kłomino. It was planned to be a recovery centre for drug addicts, meeting points for Polish enthusiasts of Harley-Davidson motorcycles, or a prison. Currently, there are five permanent residents of Kłomino. There is no bus or rail connection with other places, and the nearest shop is 4 kilometres (2.5 mi) away. Anything that can be sold has been looted, including bricks, roof tiles, pipes and wooden beams.

== Gallery ==
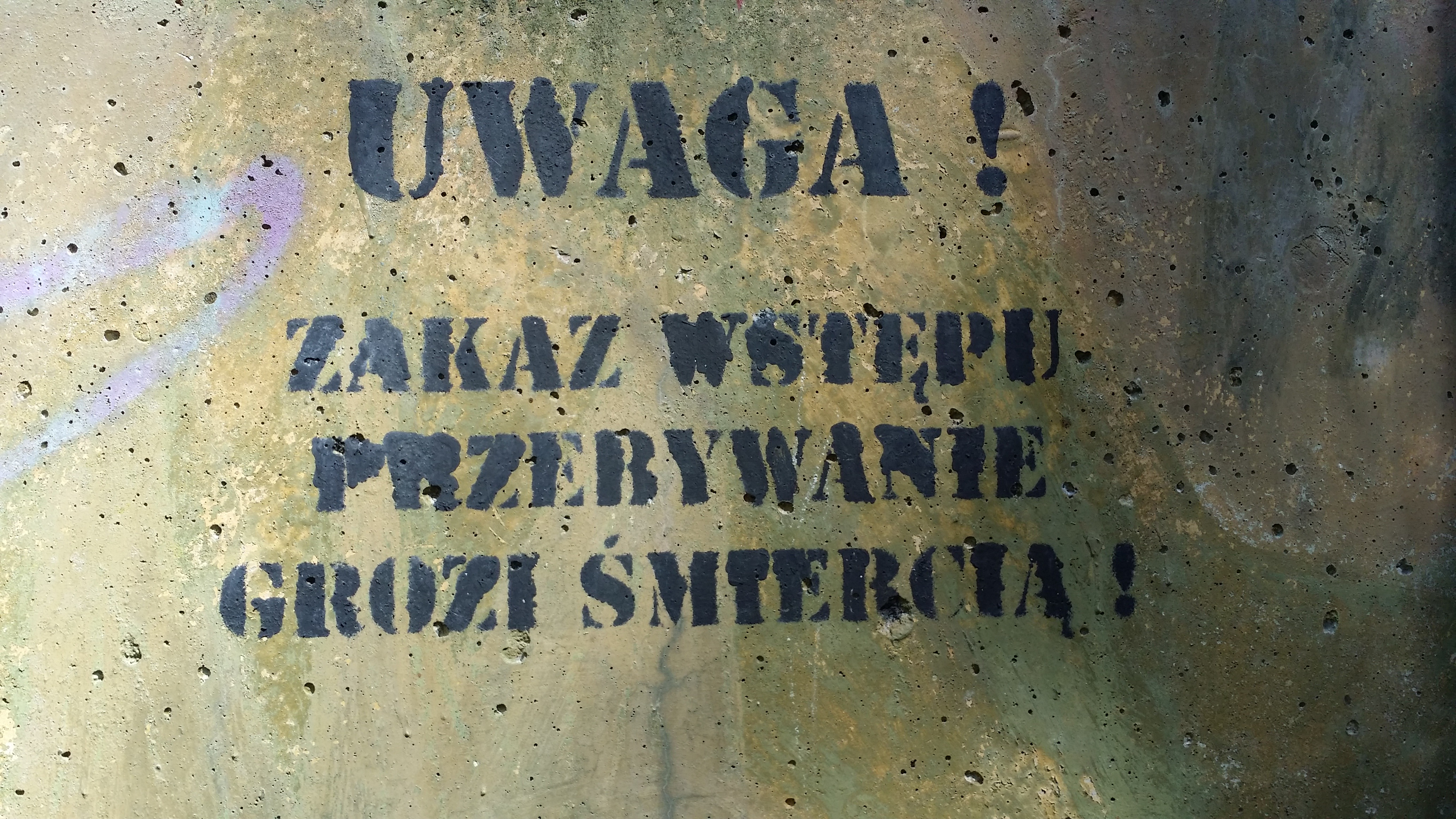
Warning sign, danger of death, in former Soviet nuclear weapons store

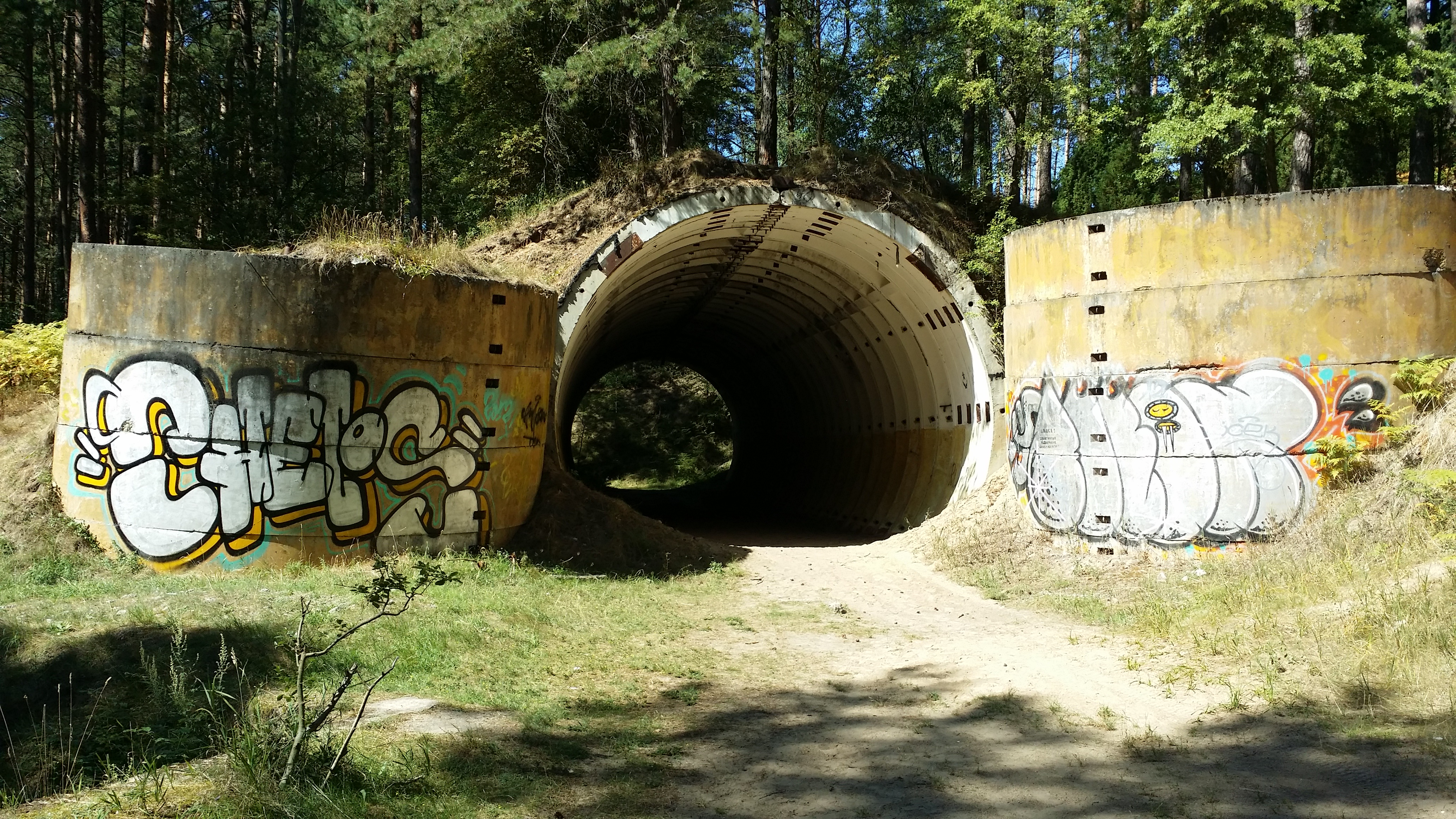
Nuclear weapons storage shelter

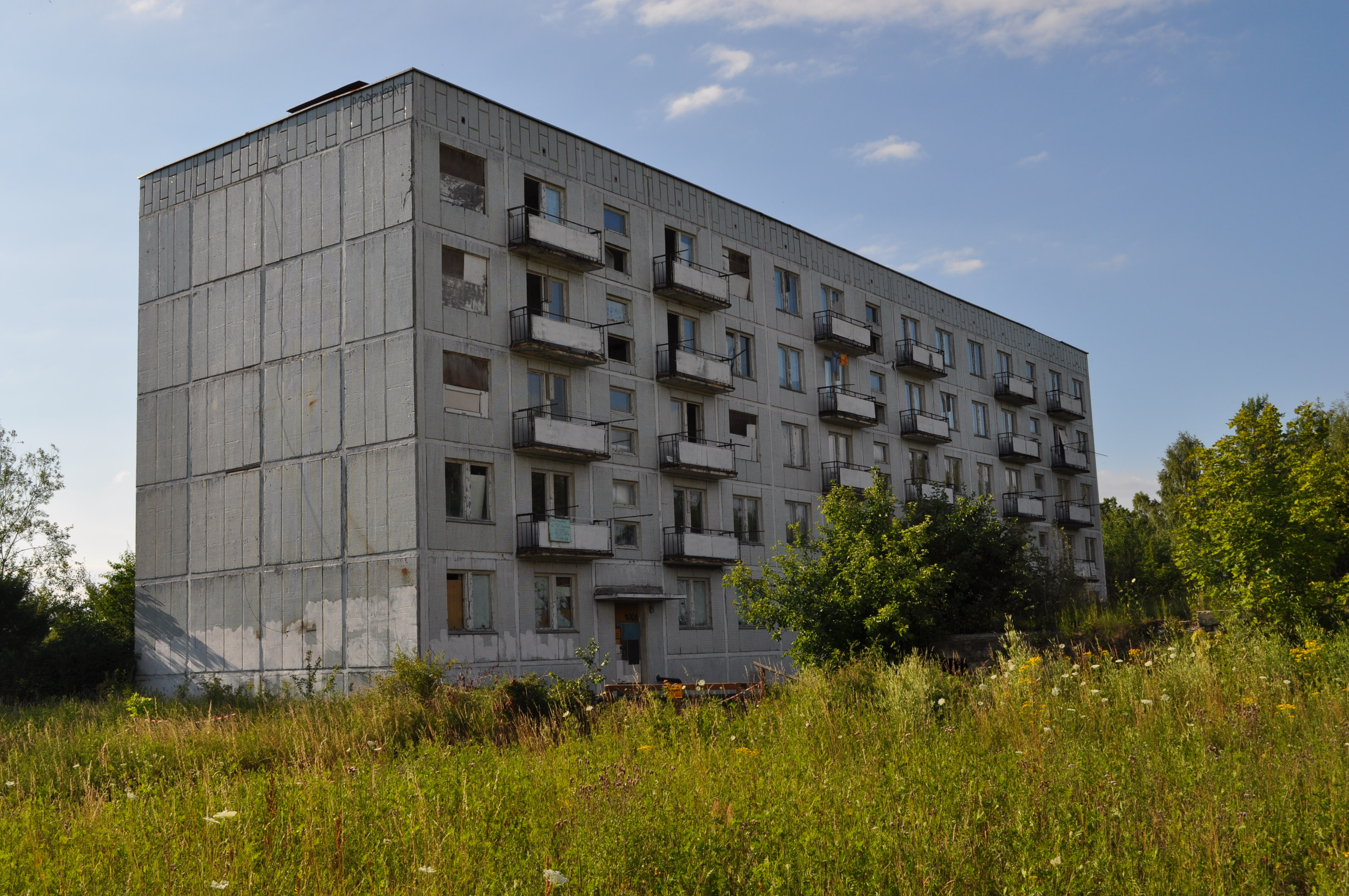
The only inhabited tower block as of July 2011

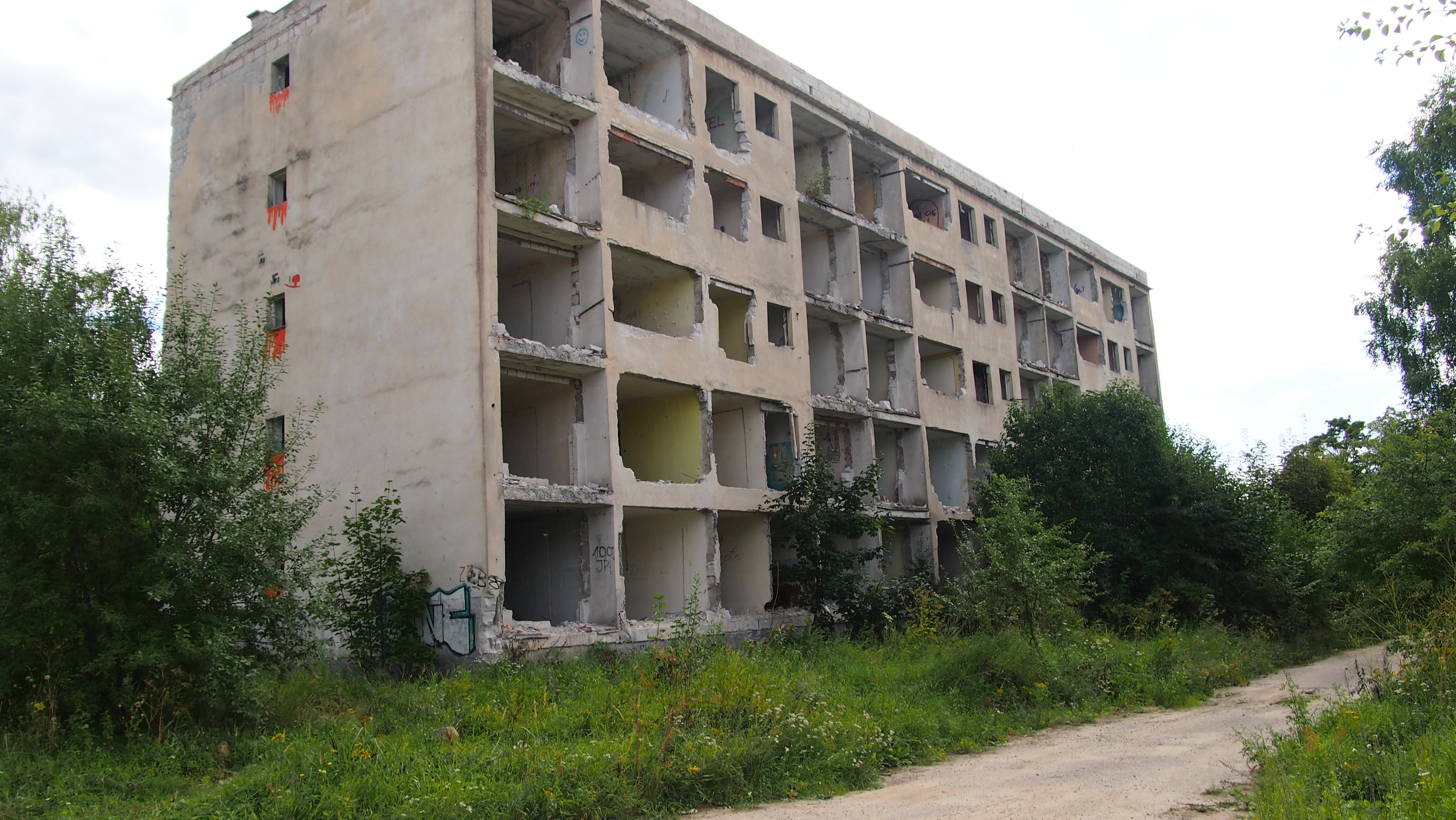
Ruined building

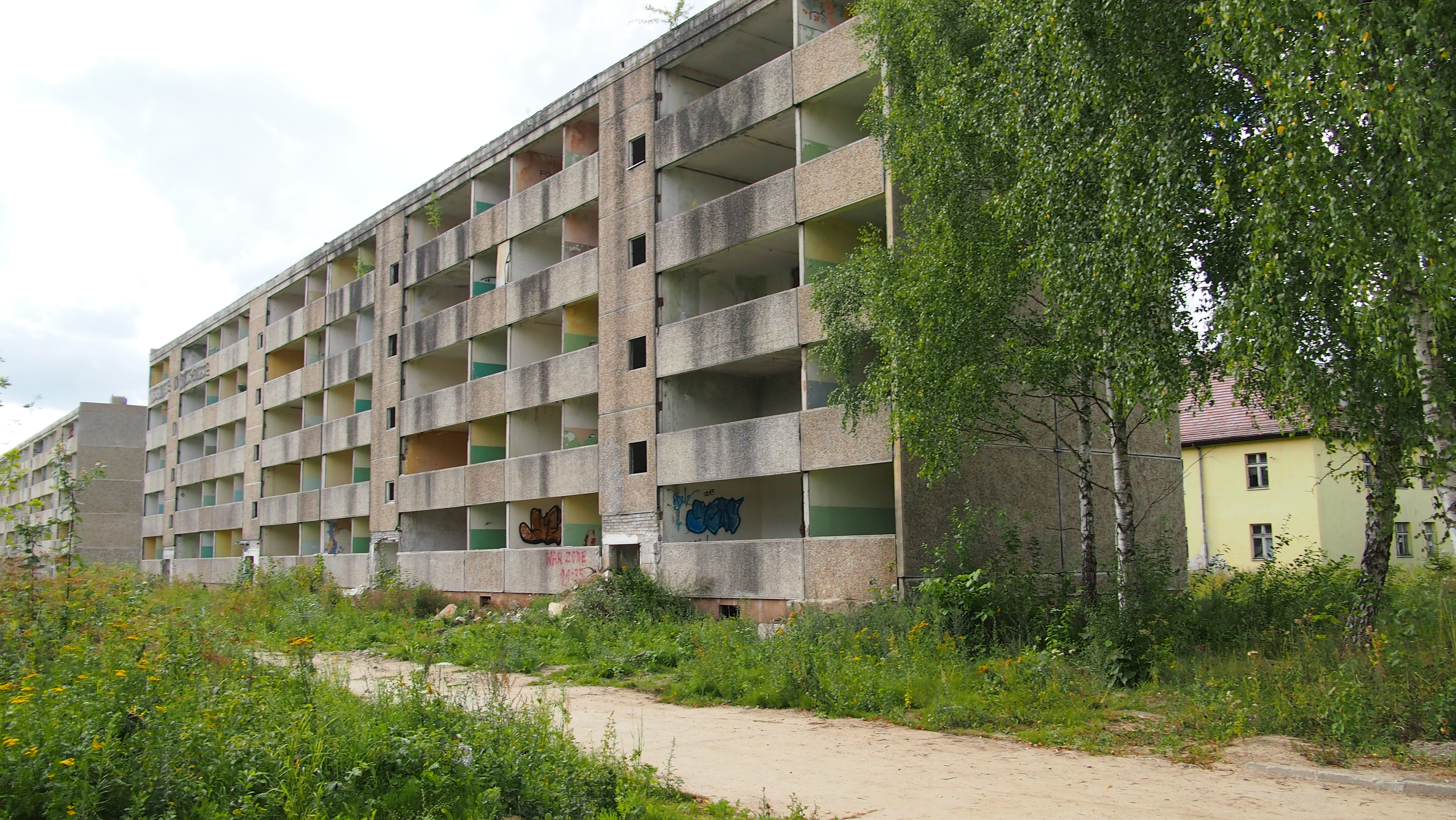
Graffiti in abandoned building

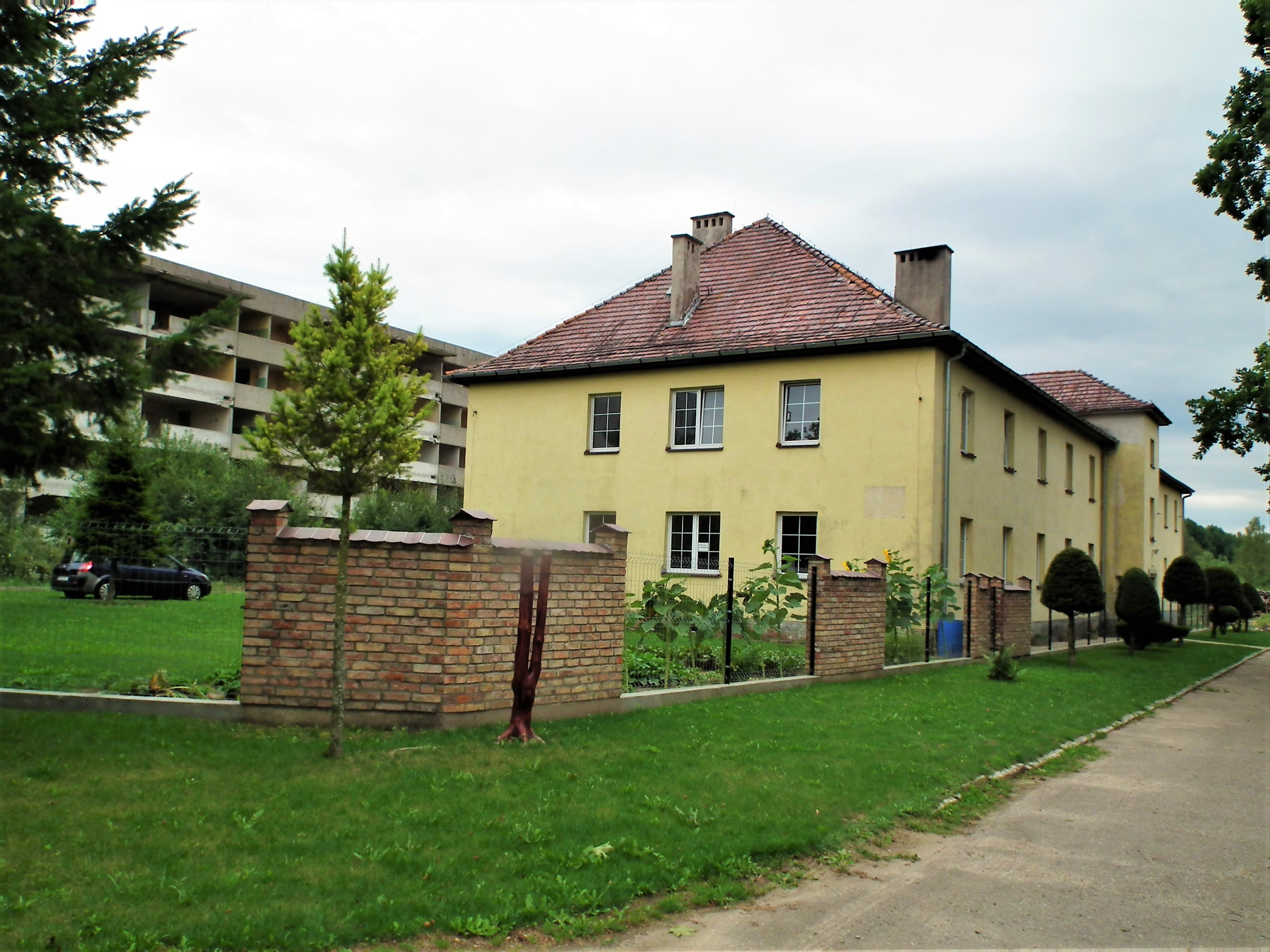
Renovated building

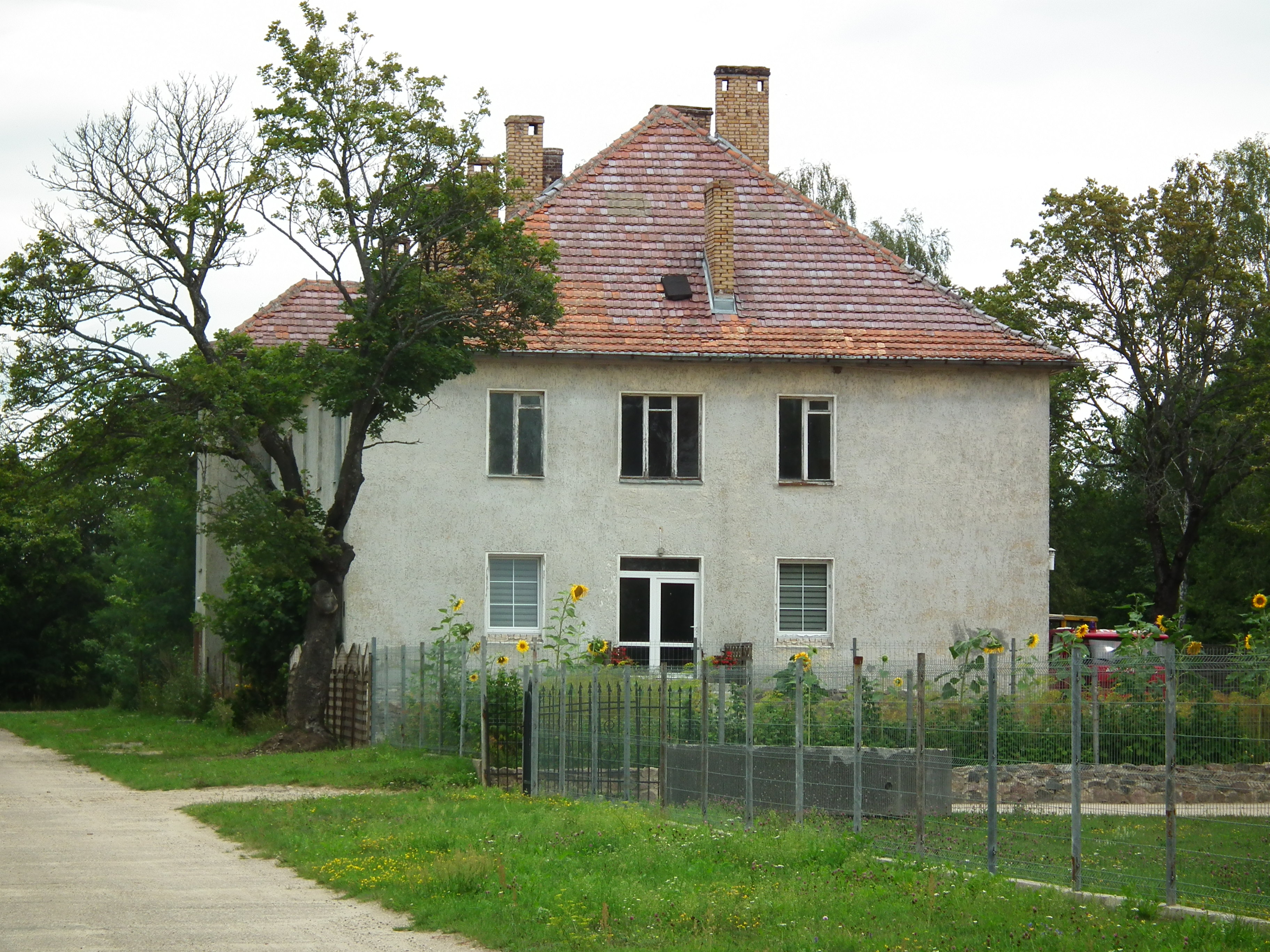
Renovated building

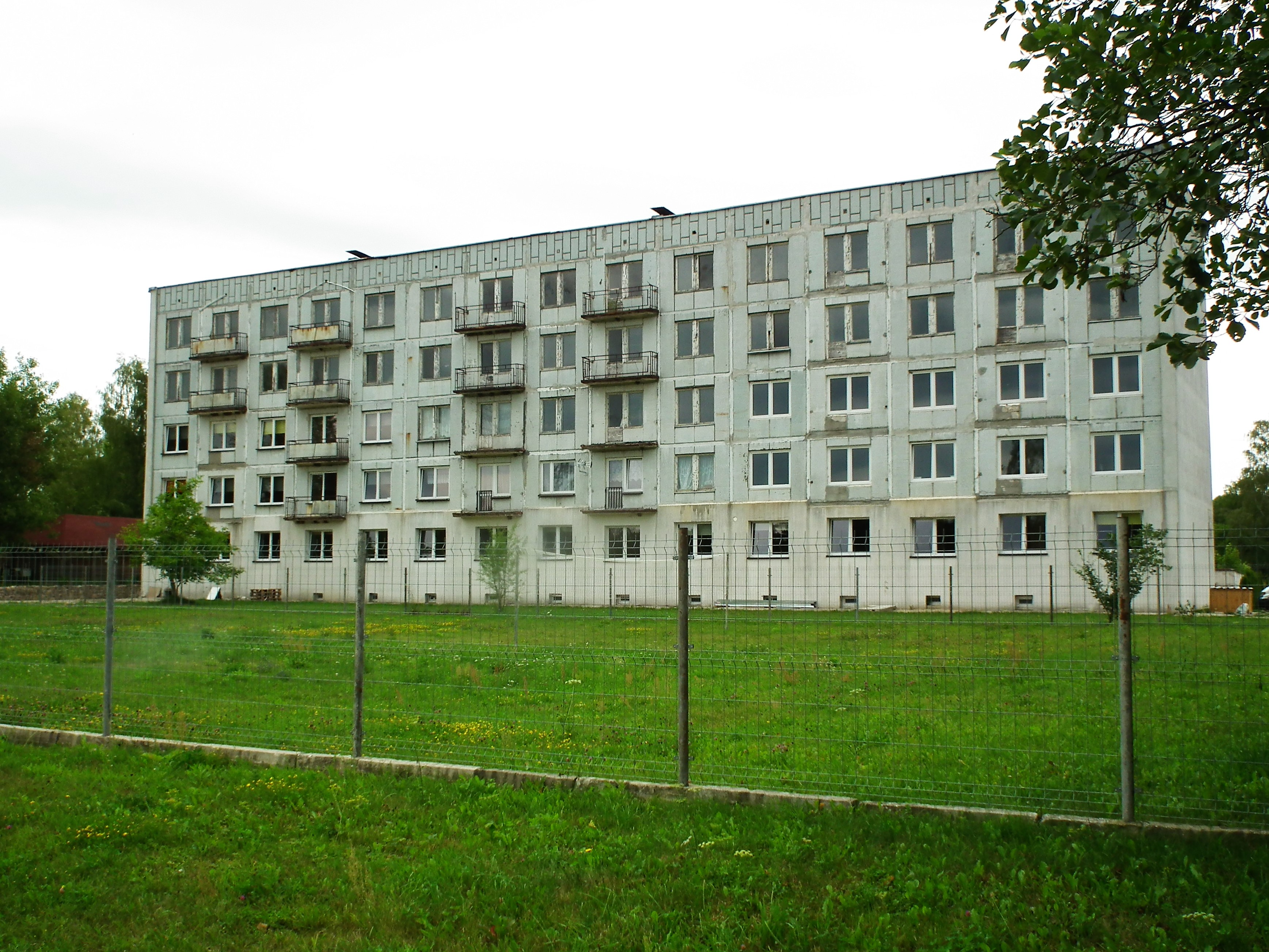
Old plate blocks

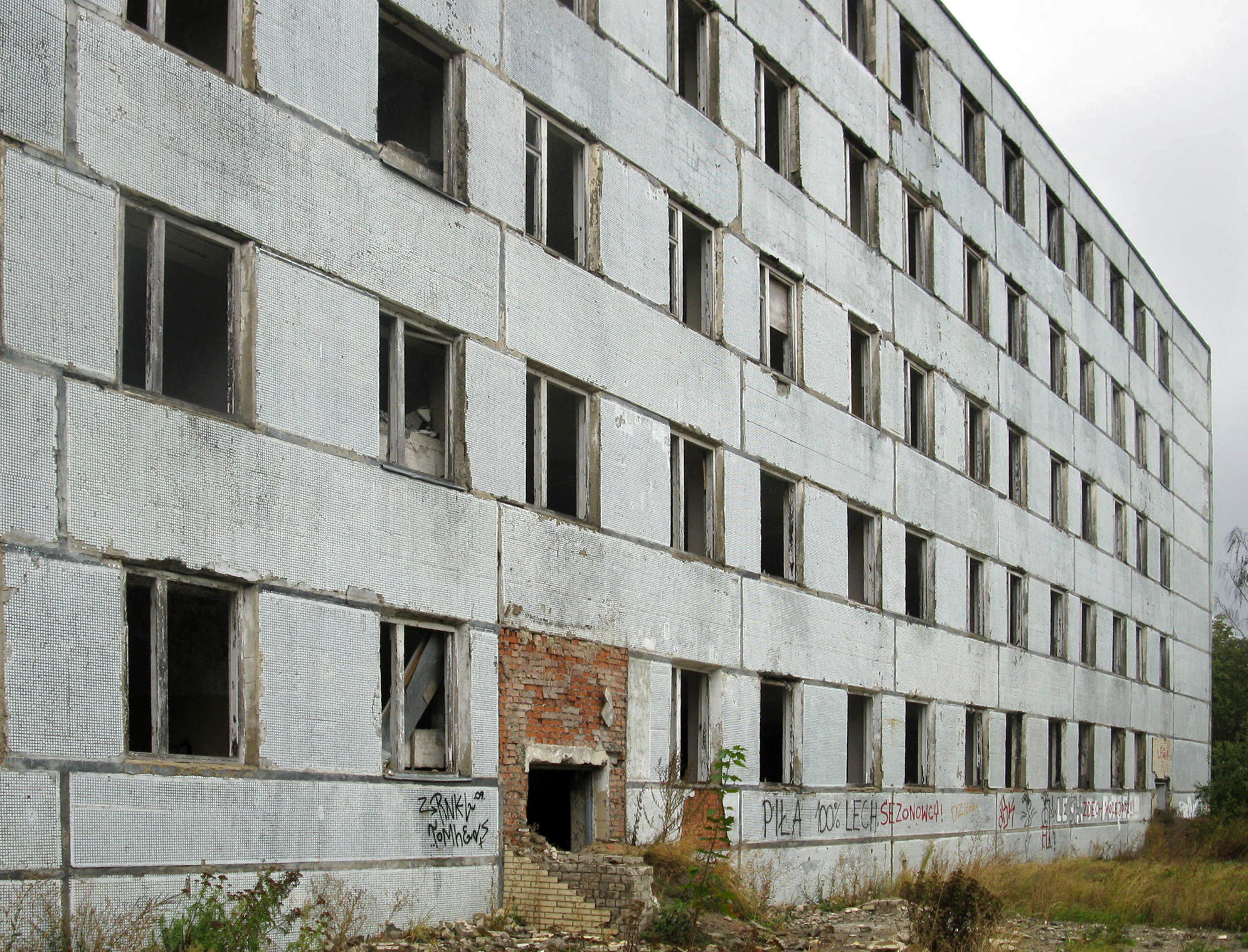
Ruined building
