= Juchowo =

- Village
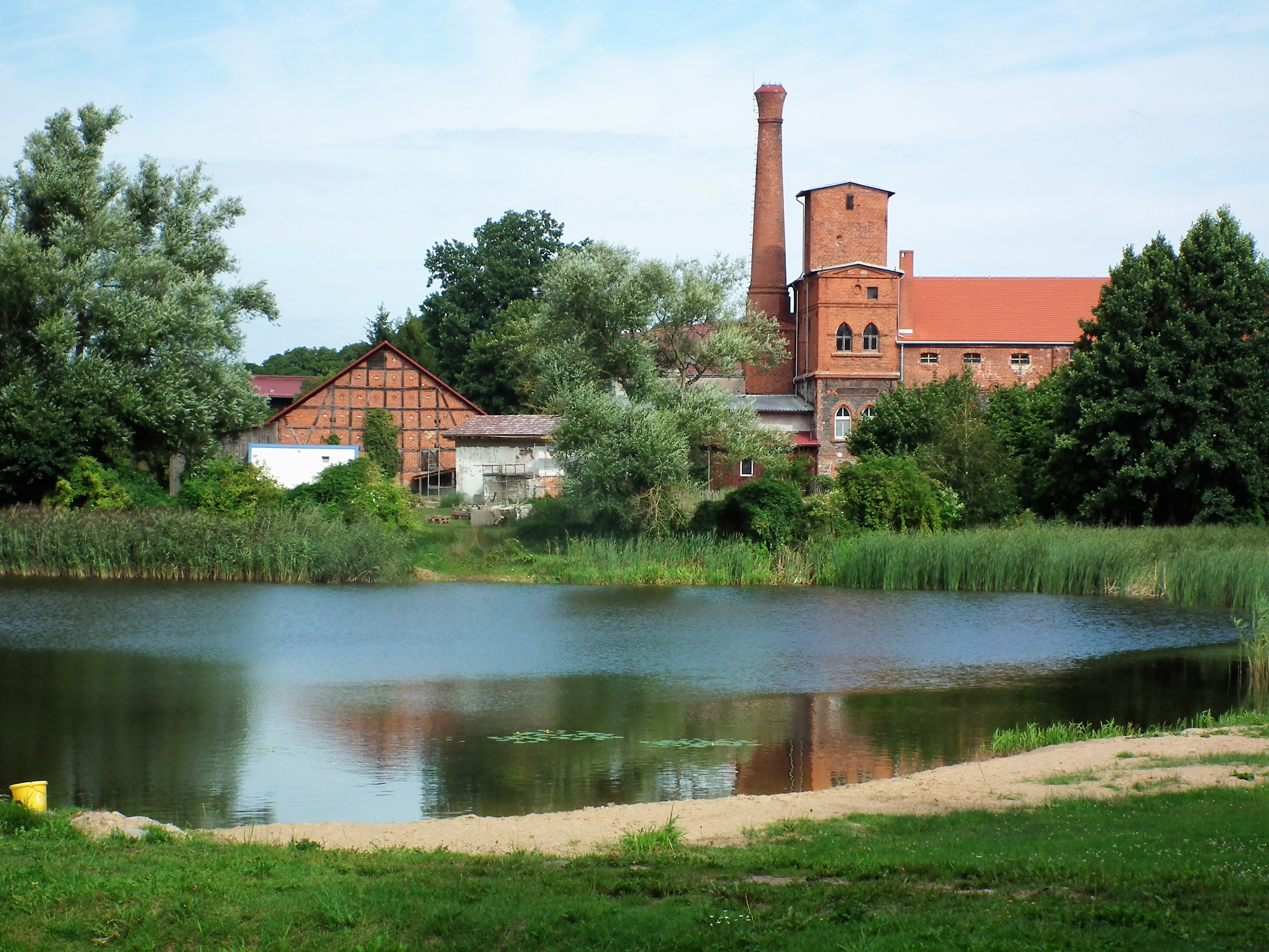

- Location within Poland
- Coordinates: 53°40′N 16°29′E
- Country: Poland
- Voivodeship: West Pomeranian
- County: Szczecinek
- Gmina: Borne Sulinowo
- Time zone: UTC+1 (CET)
  - Summer (DST): UTC+2 (CEST)
- Postal code: 78-446
- Vehicle registration: ZSZ

Juchowo [juˈxɔvɔ] (German: Juchow) is a village in the administrative district of Gmina Borne Sulinowo, within Szczecinek County, West Pomeranian Voivodeship, in north-western Poland. It lies approximately 11 km (7 mi) north of Borne Sulinowo, 15 km (9 mi) south-west of Szczecinek, and 129 km (80 mi) east of the regional capital Szczecin.

It is situated on the eastern shore of Juchowo Lake.

== History ==
The territory became part of the Duchy of Poland under its first ruler Mieszko I around 967. Following the fragmentation of Poland, it was part of the Duchy of Pomerania, later also under the suzerainty of Denmark and the Holy Roman Empire. From the 18th century, it was part of the Kingdom of Prussia and from 1871 to 1945 also Germany.
