= Jelonek, West Pomeranian Voivodeship =

Jelonek
- Village
- Location within Poland
- Coordinates: 53°37′14″N 16°36′58″E
- Country: Poland
- Voivodeship: West Pomeranian
- County: Szczecinek
- Gmina: Borne Sulinowo
- Population: 80

Jelonek [jɛˈlɔnɛk] is a village in the administrative district of Gmina Borne Sulinowo, within Szczecinek County, West Pomeranian Voivodeship, in north-western Poland. It lies approximately 8 km (5 mi) north-east of Borne Sulinowo, 12 km (7 mi) south-west of Szczecinek, and 137 km (85 mi) east of the regional capital Szczecin.

For the history of the region, see History of Pomerania.

The village has a population of 80.
