= Kłosówko, West Pomeranian Voivodeship =

Kłosówko
- Village
- Location within Poland
- Coordinates: 53°38′54″N 16°29′3″E
- Country: Poland
- Voivodeship: West Pomeranian
- County: Szczecinek
- Gmina: Borne Sulinowo

Population
  - Total: 30

Kłosówko [kwɔˈsufkɔ] (German: Gut Buchenau) is a village in the administrative district of Gmina Borne Sulinowo, Szczecinek County, West Pomeranian Voivodeship, northwestern Poland, approximately 9 km (6 mi) northwest of Borne Sulinowo, 16 km (10 mi) southwest of Szczecinek and 129 km (80 mi) east of the regional capital, Szczecin.

== See also ==
- History of Pomerania
