= Silnowo =

- Village
- Location within Poland
- Coordinates: 53°37′N 16°30′E
- Country: Poland
- Voivodeship: West Pomeranian
- County: Szczecinek
- Gmina: Borne Sulinowo
- Population: 300

Silnowo [ɕilˈnɔvɔ] (German: Eulenburg) is a village in the administrative district of Gmina Borne Sulinowo, within Szczecinek County, West Pomeranian Voivodeship, in north-western Poland. It lies approximately 5 km (3 mi) north-west of Borne Sulinowo, 17 km (11 mi) south-west of Szczecinek, and 129 km (80 mi) east of the regional capital Szczecin.

Before 1648 the area was part of Duchy of Pomerania, 1648-1945 Prussia and Germany. For the history of the region, see History of Pomerania.

The village has a population of 300.
