= Komorze, West Pomeranian Voivodeship =

Komorze
- Village
- Location within Poland
- Coordinates: 53°38′N 16°21′E
- Country: Poland
- Voivodeship: West Pomeranian
- County: Szczecinek
- Gmina: Borne Sulinowo
- Population: 60

Komorze [kɔˈmɔʐɛ] (German: Bewerdick) is a village in the administrative district of Gmina Borne Sulinowo, within Szczecinek County, West Pomeranian Voivodeship, in north-western Poland. It lies approximately 14 km (9 mi) north-west of Borne Sulinowo, 24 km (15 mi) south-west of Szczecinek, and 120 km (75 mi) east of the regional capital Szczecin.

Before 1772 the area was part of Kingdom of Poland, 1772-1945 Prussia and Germany. For more on its history, see Drahim County and History of Pomerania.

The village has a population of 60.
