= Grzywnik =

- Village
- Location within Poland
- Coordinates: 53°39′52″N 16°34′12″E
- Country: Poland
- Voivodeship: West Pomeranian
- County: Szczecinek
- Gmina: Borne Sulinowo
- Population: 20

Grzywnik [ˈɡʐɨvnik] is a village in the administrative district of Gmina Borne Sulinowo, within Szczecinek County, West Pomeranian Voivodeship, in north-western Poland. It lies approximately 10 km (6 mi) north of Borne Sulinowo, 10 km (6 mi) south-west of Szczecinek, and 135 km (84 mi) east of the regional capital Szczecin.

For the history of the region, see History of Pomerania.

The village has a population of 20.
