= Jeziorna, West Pomeranian Voivodeship =

Jeziorna
- Village
- Location within Poland
- Coordinates: 53°32′N 16°27′E
- Country: Poland
- Voivodeship: West Pomeranian
- County: Szczecinek
- Gmina: Borne Sulinowo

Jeziorna [jɛˈʑɔrna] is a village in the administrative district of Gmina Borne Sulinowo, within Szczecinek County, West Pomeranian Voivodeship, in north-western Poland. It lies approximately 8 km (5 mi) south-west of Borne Sulinowo, 26 km (16 mi) south-west of Szczecinek, and 125 km (78 mi) east of the regional capital Szczecin.

Before 1772 the area was part of Kingdom of Poland, 1772-1945 Prussia and Germany. For more on its history, see Drahim County and History of Pomerania.
