= Rakowo, Szczecinek County =

Rakowo
- Village
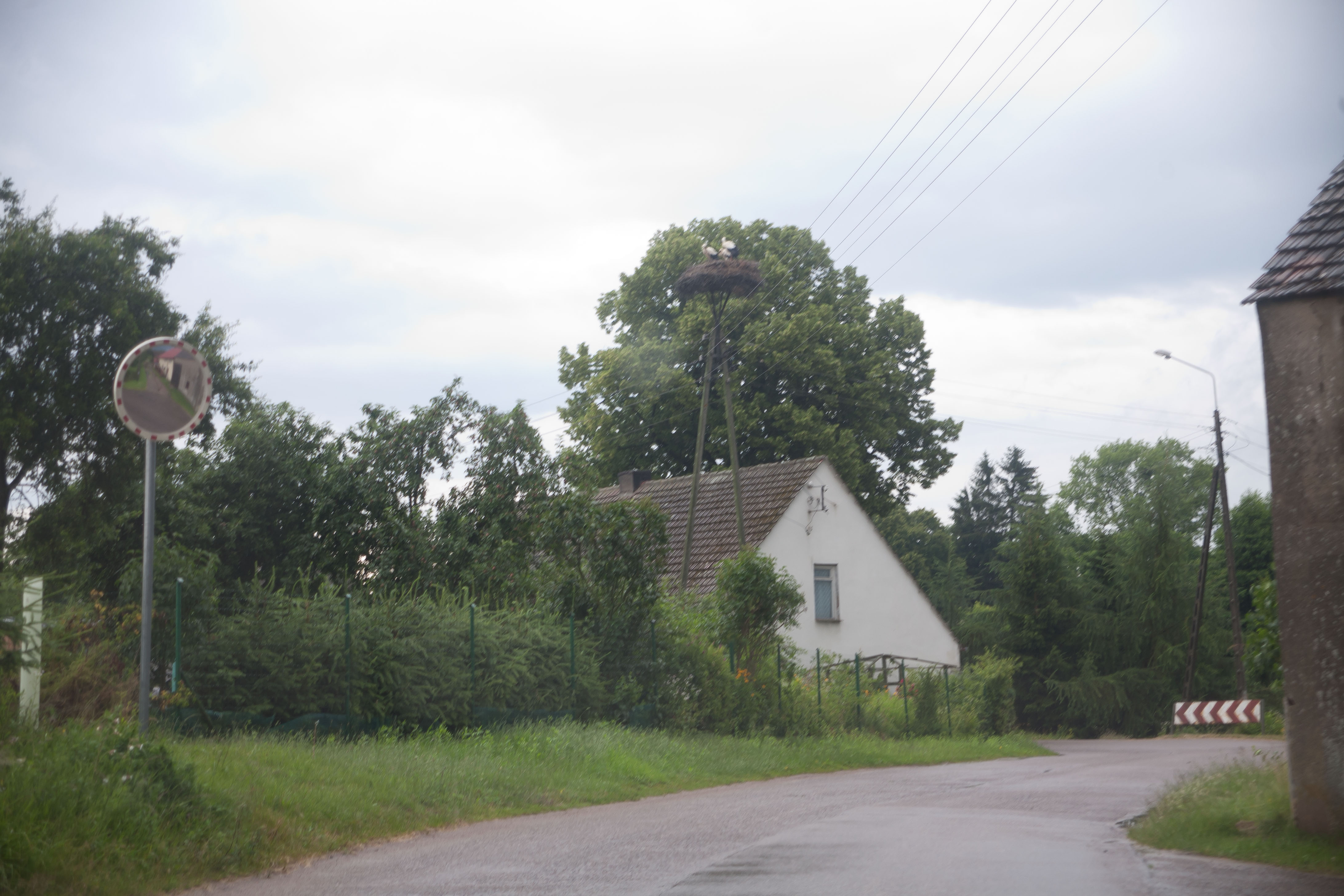
- Stork nest in Rakowo

- Location within Poland
- Coordinates: 53°36′40″N 16°21′36″E
- Country: Poland
- Voivodeship: West Pomeranian
- County: Szczecinek
- Gmina: Borne Sulinowo
- Time zone: UTC+1 (CET)
  - Summer (DST): UTC+2 (CEST)
- Vehicle registration: ZSZ

Rakowo [raˈkɔvɔ] (German: Rackow) is a village in the administrative district of Gmina Borne Sulinowo, within Szczecinek County, West Pomeranian Voivodeship, in north-western Poland.

== History ==
The territory became a part of the emerging Polish state under its first historic ruler Mieszko I in the 10th century. Rakowo was a royal village of the Kingdom of Poland, administratively located in the Wałcz County in the Poznań Voivodeship in the Greater Poland Province. It was annexed by Prussia in the First Partition of Poland in 1772, and from 1871 to 1945 it was also part of Germany.
