= Piława, Szczecinek County =

Piława
- Village
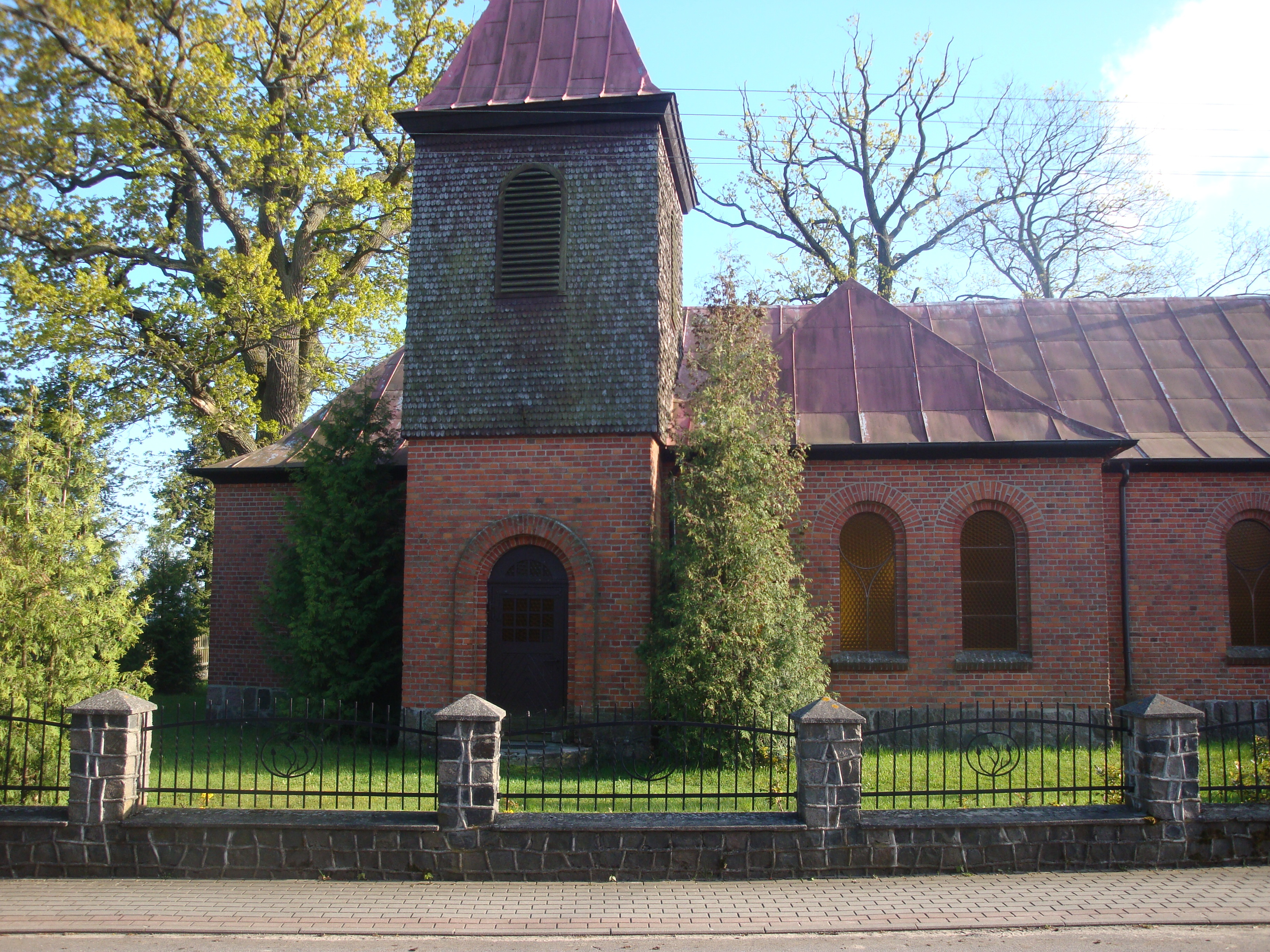
- Saints Peter and Paul church in Piława

- Location within Poland
- Coordinates: 53°37′00″N 16°27′48″E
- Country: Poland
- Voivodeship: West Pomeranian
- County: Szczecinek
- Gmina: Borne Sulinowo
- Time zone: UTC+1 (CET)
  - Summer (DST): UTC+2 (CEST)
- Vehicle registration: ZSZ

Piława [piˈwava] (German: Pielburg) is a village in the administrative district of Gmina Borne Sulinowo, within Szczecinek County, West Pomeranian Voivodeship, in north-western Poland. It is situated on the northwestern shore of Lake Pile in the historic region of Pomerania.
