= Grabno, Szczecinek County =

Grabno
- Settlement
- Location within Poland
- Coordinates: 53°39′04″N 16°34′58″E
- Country: Poland
- Voivodeship: West Pomeranian
- County: Szczecinek
- Gmina: Borne Sulinowo

Grabno [ˈɡrabnɔ] (German: Graben) is a settlement in the administrative district of Gmina Borne Sulinowo, within Szczecinek County, West Pomeranian Voivodeship, in north-western Poland.

== See also ==
History of Pomerania
