= Ciemino Małe =

- Settlement
- Location within Poland
- Coordinates: 53°37′50″N 16°33′11″E
- Country: Poland
- Voivodeship: West Pomeranian
- County: Szczecinek
- Gmina: Borne Sulinowo

Ciemino Małe [t͡ɕɛˈminɔ ˈmawɛ] (German: Klein Zemmin) is a settlement in the administrative district of Gmina Borne Sulinowo, within Szczecinek County, West Pomeranian Voivodeship, in north-western Poland.
