= Gmina Borne Sulinowo =

Gmina Borne Sulinowo Borne Sulinowo Commune
- Gmina
- Flag Coat of arms
- Interactive map of Gmina Borne Sulinowo
- Coordinates (Borne Sulinowo): 53°34′52″N 16°32′0″E
- Country: Poland
- Voivodeship: West Pomeranian
- County: Szczecinek
- Seat: Borne Sulinowo

Area
  - Total: 484.24 km^{2} (186.97 sq mi)

Population (2006)
  - Total: 9,230
  - Density: 19.1/km^{2} (49.4/sq mi)
  - Urban: 4,224
  - Rural: 5,006
- Website: http://www.bornesulinowo.pl/

Gmina Borne Sulinowo is an urban-rural gmina (administrative district) in Szczecinek County, West Pomeranian Voivodeship, in north-western Poland. Its seat is the town of Borne Sulinowo, which lies approximately 19 kilometres (12 mi) south-west of Szczecinek and 131 km (81 mi) east of the regional capital Szczecin.

The gmina covers an area of 484.24 square kilometres (187.0 sq mi), and as of 2006 its total population is 9,230, of which the population of Borne Sulinowo is 4,224, and the population of the rural part of the gmina is 5,006.

The gmina contains part of the protected area called Drawsko Landscape Park.

== Villages ==
Apart from the town of Borne Sulinowo, Gmina Borne Sulinowo contains the villages and settlements of Ciemino, Ciemino Małe, Czochryń, Dąbie, Dąbrowica, Grabno, Grzywnik, Jeleń, Jelonek, Jeziorna, Juchowo, Kądzielnia, Kiełpino, Kłomino, Kłosówko, Kolanowo, Komorze, Krągi, Kucharowo, Łączno, Liszkowo, Łubowo, Międzylesie, Nobliny, Obrąb, Okole, Osiczyn, Piława, Przyjezierze, Radacz, Rakowo, Silnowo, Śmiadowo, Starowice, Strzeszyn, Uniemino and Zamęcie.

== Neighbouring gminas ==
Gmina Borne Sulinowo is bordered by the gminas of Barwice, Czaplinek, Grzmiąca, Jastrowie, Okonek and Szczecinek.
