= Oflag II-D =

World War II German prisoner-of-war camp

- Gross Born (Borne Sulinowo), Pomerania, near Westfalenhof (Kłomino)
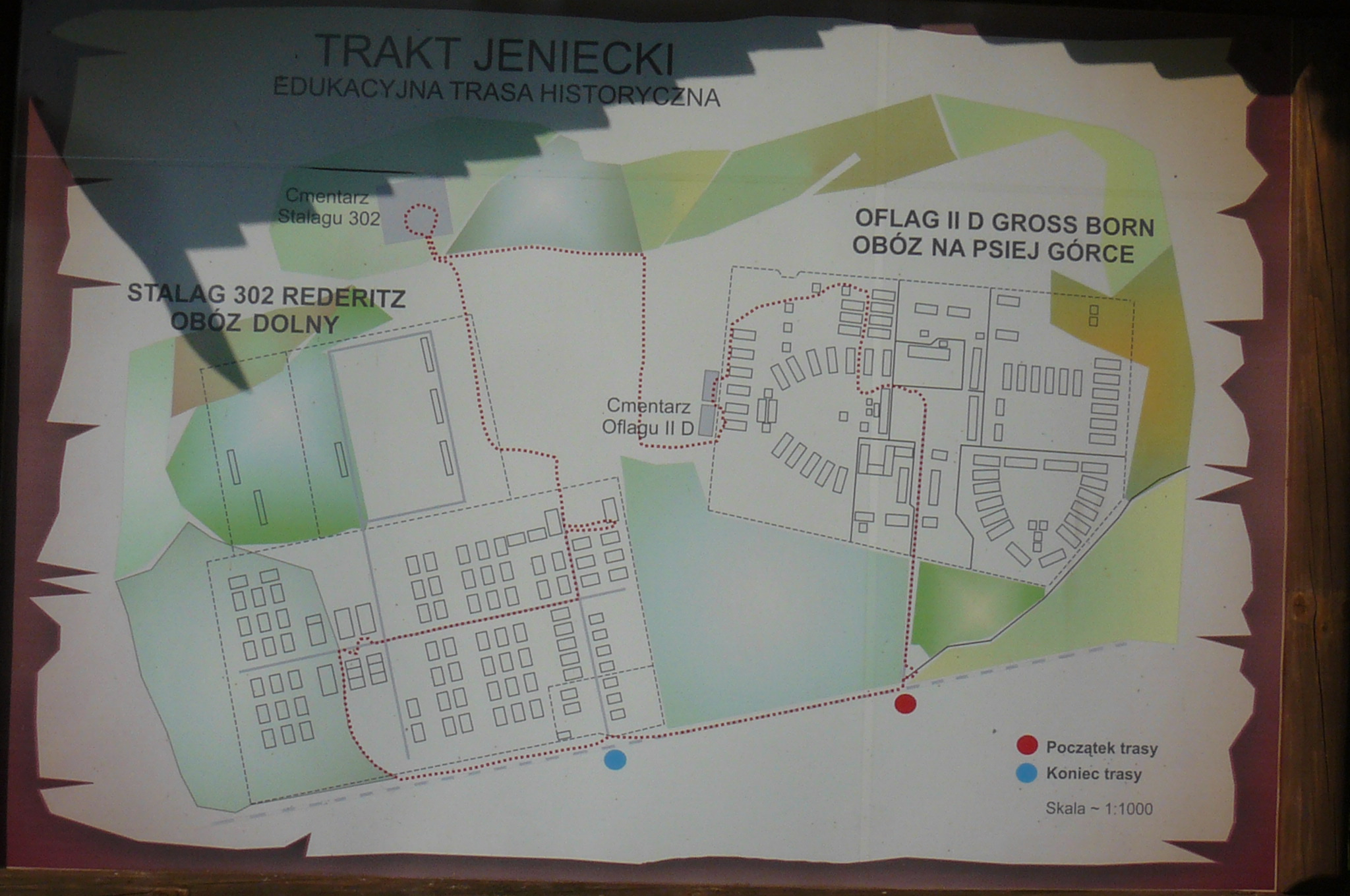
- Plan of the camp in Polish

Site information
- Type: Prisoner-of-war camp
- Controlled by: Nazi Germany

Location
- Coordinates: 53.573°N 16.537°E

Site history
- In use: 1940–1945
- Battles/wars: World War II

Garrison information
- Occupants: French and Polish officers

Oflag II-D Gross Born (Grossborn-Westfalenhof) was a World War II German prisoner-of-war camp located at Gross Born, Pomerania (now Borne Sulinowo, West Pomeranian Voivodeship, Poland), near Westfalenhof (Kłomino). It housed Polish and French officers.

== Camp history ==
In the late 1930s the German Army built a large base and training ground at which the XIX Corps of General Heinz Guderian was based.

In September 1939 two Stalags, Stalag 302 and Stalag 323 were established to house Polish prisoners from the German September 1939 offensive.

The Polish POWs were transferred to other camps on 1 June 1940 and Oflag II-D was established to house French officers from the Battle of France. By February 1941 there were 3,166 officers and 565 orderlies in the camp.

In 1942 some of the French officers may have been transferred to other camps and replaced with Polish officers.

In 1942 a large camp (Stalag 323) was built for Soviet prisoners. It was located at the other end of the training ground. Conditions in this camp were deplorable, as the rules of the Third Geneva Convention were not observed for Soviet prisoners.

In October 1944 some 350 Polish soldiers of the Warsaw Uprising were brought to this camp from Stalag 344, and later further several hundred were brought from Stalag XI-B.

The roster of 1 January 1945 showed that there were 5,014 officers and 377 orderlies in the camp.

In November 1944 the officers created a bank which printed banknotes.

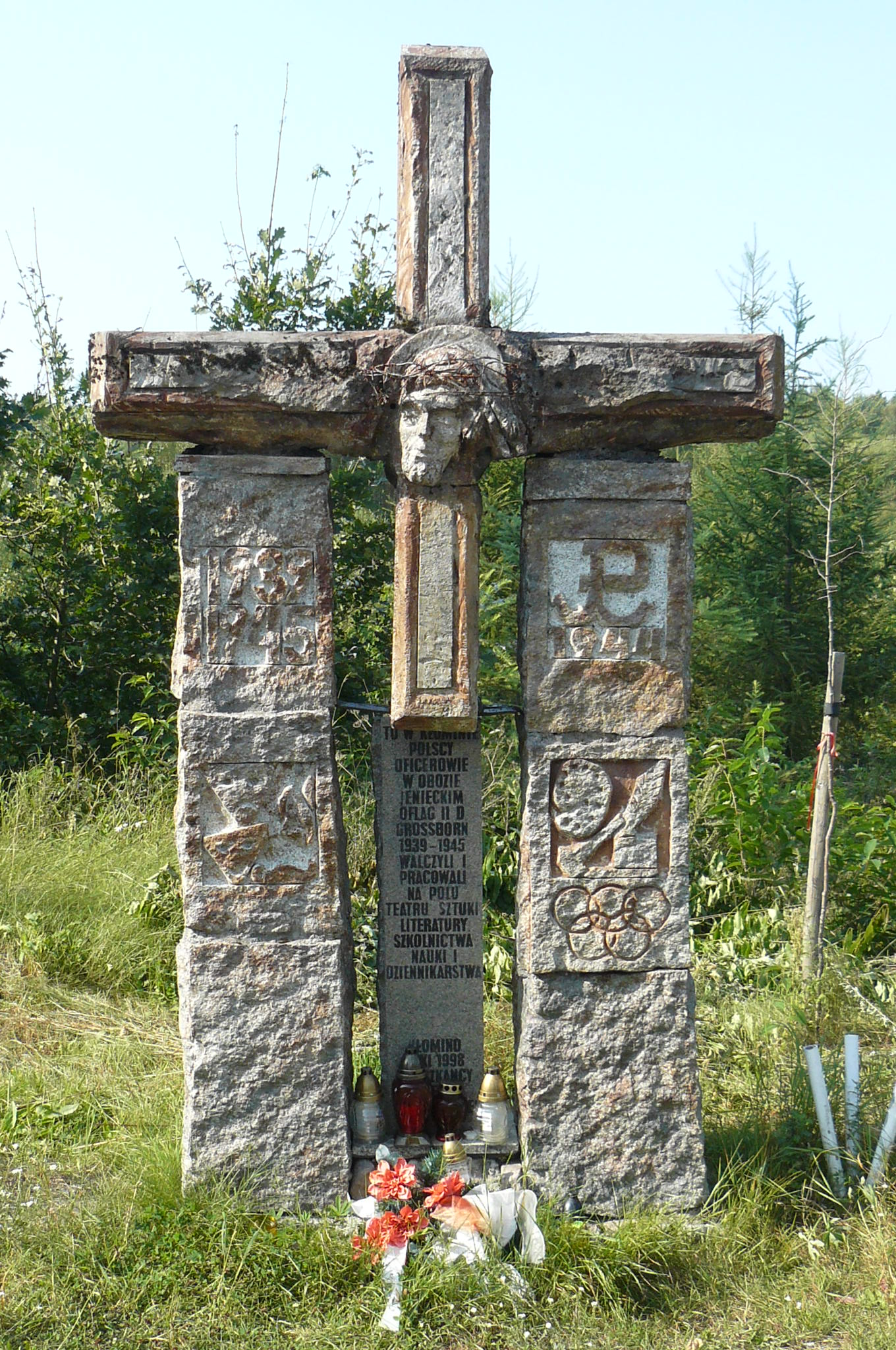
Monument to Polish POWs

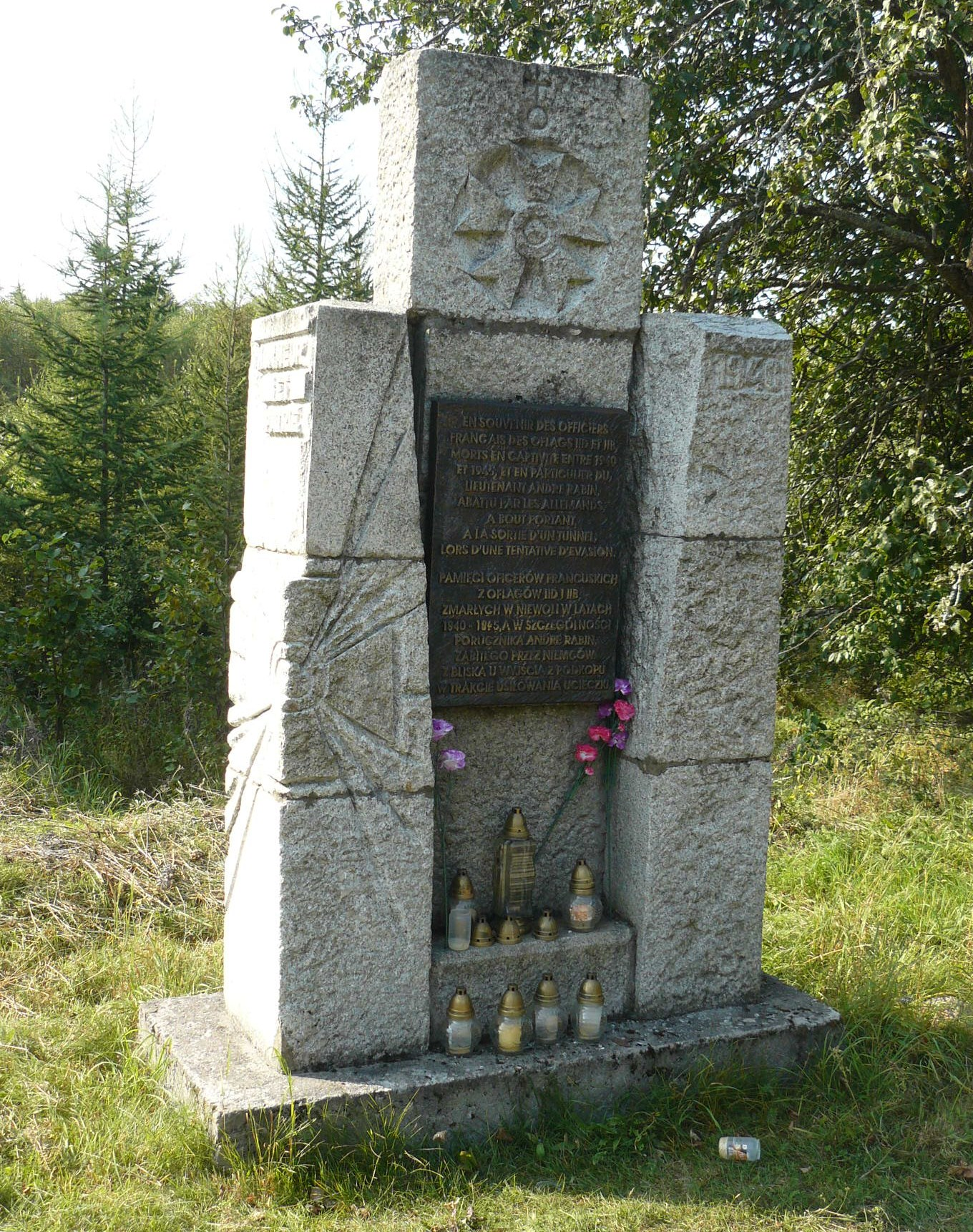
Monument to French POWs

== Evacuation and repatriation ==
When the offensive of the Soviet Red Army resumed in 1945, all inmates were marched westward on 28 January 1945. Only those too sick to walk were left behind. After an eight-week 500 kilometres (310 mi) march in bitterly cold weather they reached Stalag X-B and Marlag und Milag Nord in Sandbostel. The prisoners were liberated there by units of the British Army on 5 May 1945.

== Aftermath ==
A memorial to the French and Polish officers who died in Oflag II-D was erected at the site of the camp in the late 1990s (town of Opole); there is a French association of former prisoners and their descendants.

== Notable inmates ==
- Otto Gordziałkowski, Polish Olympic rower
- Franciszek Kawa, Polish Olympic cross-country skier
- Henryk Niezabitowski, Polish Olympic rower
- Edward Pfeiffer, Polish Colonel, officer of the Home Army, participant of the Warsaw Uprising
- Paul Ricœur, French philosopher
- Zygmunt Weiss, Polish Olympic sprinter and sport journalist
- Karol Ziemski, Polish Colonel, officer of the Home Army, participant of the Warsaw Uprising

== See also ==
- List of prisoner-of-war camps in Germany
- Oflag

== Bibliography ==
- Fœssel, Paul; Lamouche, Michaël; Ricœur, Fabien (2007). Anthologie. Paris: Editions de Seuil. ISBN 978-2-75-780300-4.
- Urban, Renata (2021). "Polscy olimpijczycy w niemieckich obozach jenieckich". Łambinowicki rocznik muzealny (in Polish). 44. Opole. ISSN 0137-5199.
