= Strzeszyn, Gmina Borne Sulinowo =

Strzeszyn
- Village
- Location within Poland
- Coordinates: 53°36′54″N 16°25′17″E
- Country: Poland
- Voivodeship: West Pomeranian
- County: Szczecinek
- Gmina: Borne Sulinowo
- Population: 30

Strzeszyn [ˈstʂɛʂɨn] is a village in the administrative district of Gmina Borne Sulinowo, within Szczecinek County, West Pomeranian Voivodeship, in north-western Poland. It lies approximately 9 km (6 mi) north-west of Borne Sulinowo, 21 km (13 mi) south-west of Szczecinek, and 124 km (77 mi) east of the regional capital Szczecin.

Before 1648 the area was part of Duchy of Pomerania, 1648-1945 Prussia and Germany. For the history of the region, see History of Pomerania.

The village has a population of 30.
