= Ciemino, West Pomeranian Voivodeship =

Ciemino
- Village
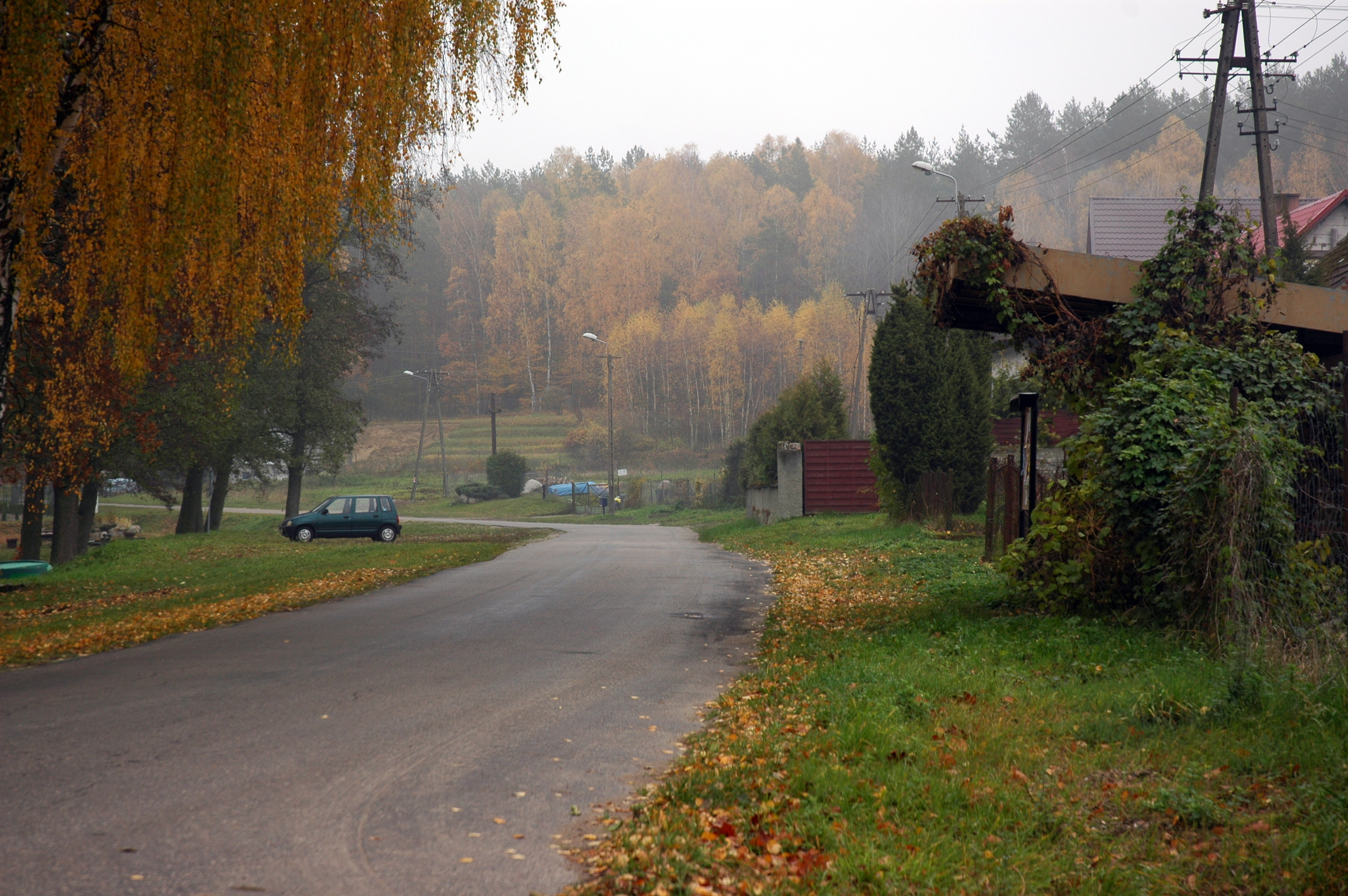
- Road in Ciemino

- Location within Poland
- Coordinates: 53°37′42″N 16°33′33″E
- Country: Poland
- Voivodeship: West Pomeranian
- County: Szczecinek
- Gmina: Borne Sulinowo

Ciemino [t͡ɕɛˈminɔ] (German: Groß Zemmin) is a village in the administrative district of Gmina Borne Sulinowo, within Szczecinek County, West Pomeranian Voivodeship, in north-western Poland.
