= Łączno, West Pomeranian Voivodeship =

Łączno
- Village
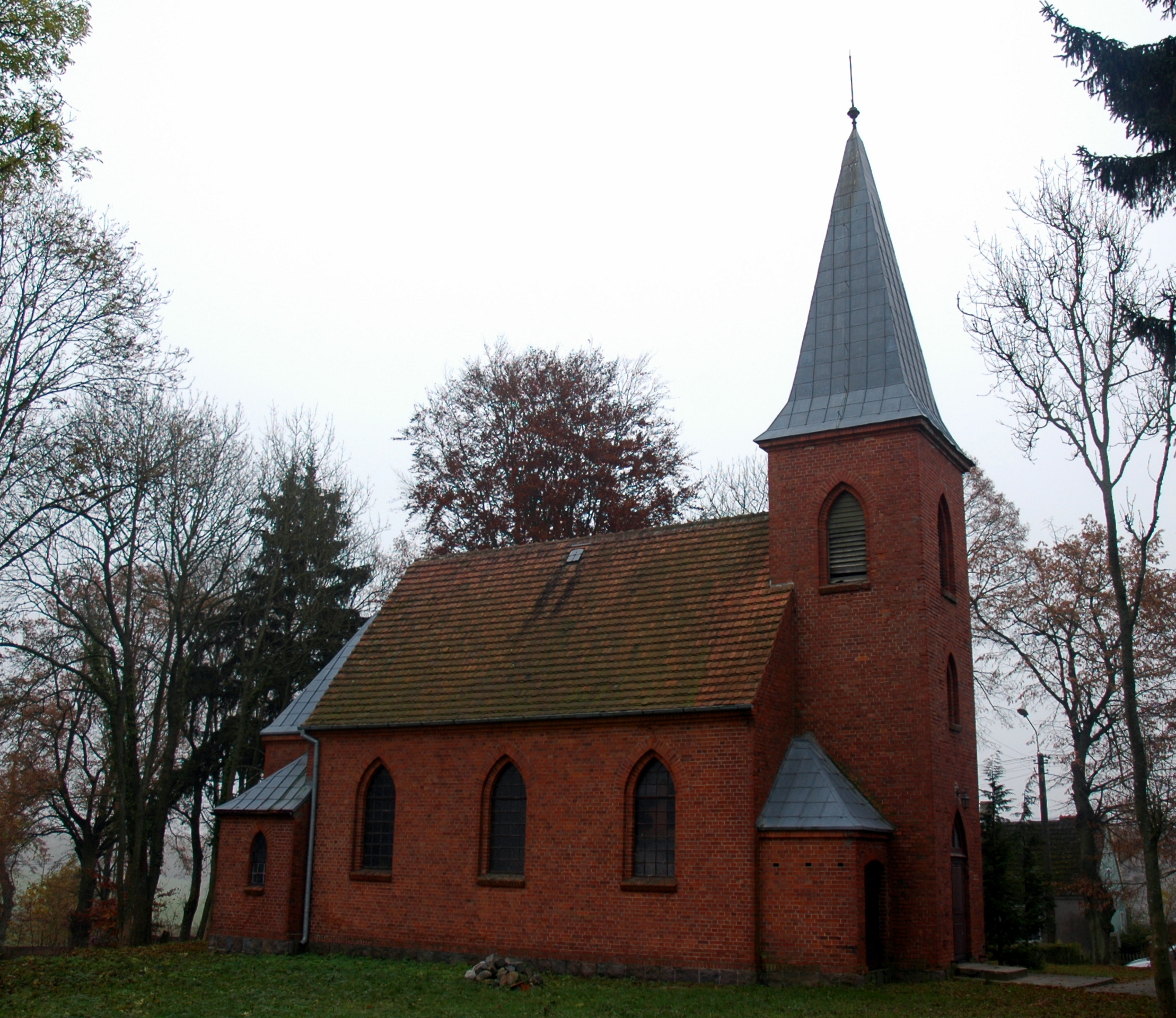

- Location within Poland
- Coordinates: 53°37′57″N 16°31′59″E
- Country: Poland
- Voivodeship: West Pomeranian
- County: Szczecinek
- Gmina: Borne Sulinowo

Łączno [ˈwɔnt͡ʂnɔ] (German: Lanzen) is a village in the administrative district of Gmina Borne Sulinowo, within Szczecinek County, West Pomeranian Voivodeship, in north-western Poland.

For the history of the region, see History of Pomerania.
