= Starowice, West Pomeranian Voivodeship =

Starowice
- Village
- Location within Poland
- Coordinates: 53°31′46″N 16°28′10″E
- Country: Poland
- Voivodeship: West Pomeranian
- County: Szczecinek
- Gmina: Borne Sulinowo

Starowice [starɔˈvit͡sɛ] (German: Groß Zacharin) is a village in the administrative district of Gmina Borne Sulinowo, within Szczecinek County, West Pomeranian Voivodeship, in north-western Poland.

Before 1772, the area was part of Kingdom of Poland, 1772-1945 Prussia and Germany. For more on its history, see Drahim County and History of Pomerania.
