= Borne Sulinowo =

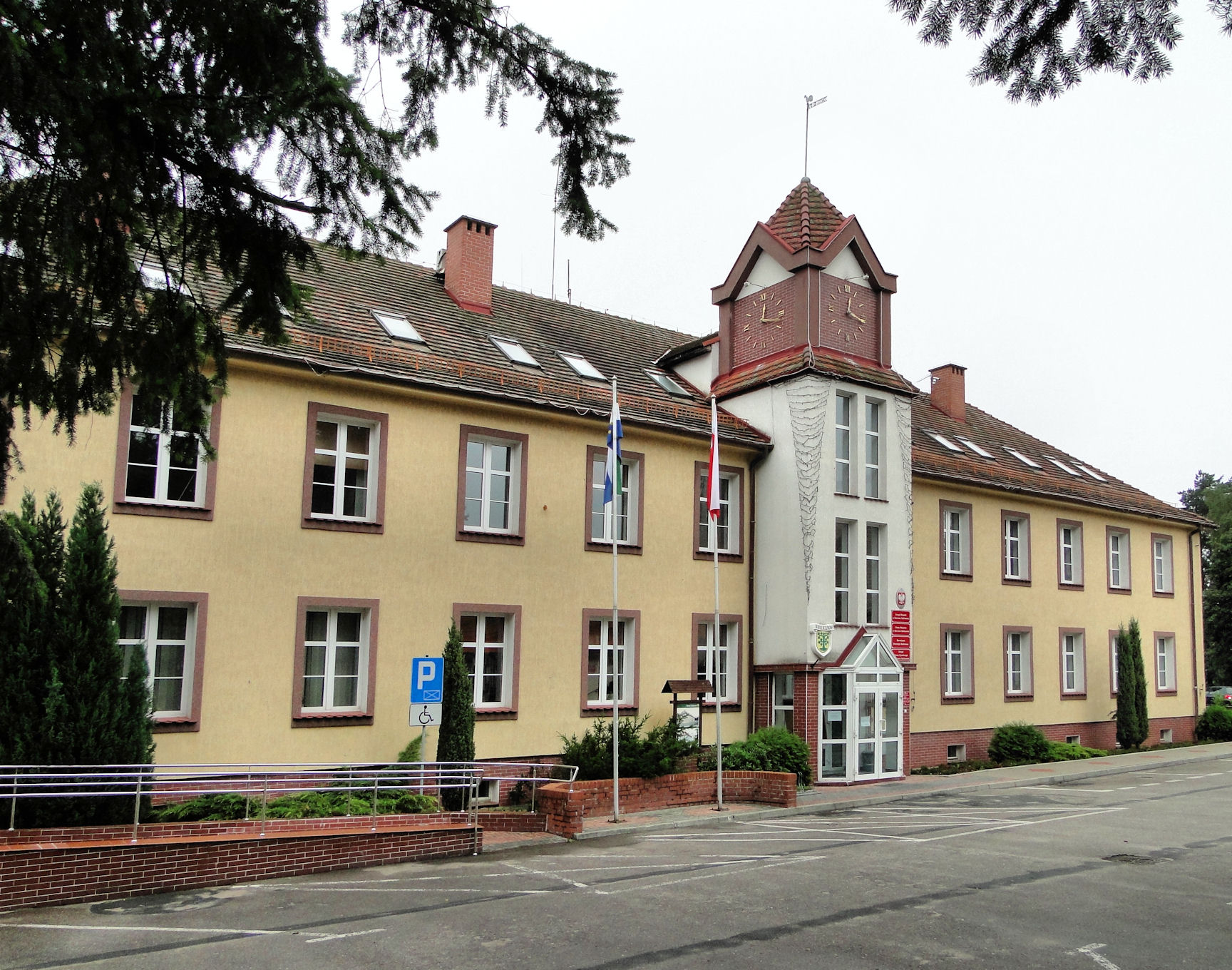
- Town hall, before 1992 the headquarters of the command of the garrison

- Flag Coat of arms

- Location within Poland
- Coordinates: 53°34′55″N 16°32′21″E
- Country: Poland
- Voivodeship: West Pomeranian
- County: Szczecinek
- Gmina: Borne Sulinowo
- Established: 15th century
- Town rights: 15 September 1993

Government
  - Mayor: Dorota Chrzanowska

Area
  - Total: 18.15 km^{2} (7.01 sq mi)

Population (30 June 2021)
  - Total: 5,008
  - Density: 275.9/km^{2} (714.6/sq mi)
- Time zone: UTC+1 (CET)
  - Summer (DST): UTC+2 (CEST)
- Postal code: 78-449
- Area code: +48 94
- Car plates: ZSZ
- Website: www.bornesulinowo.pl

Borne Sulinowo [ˈbɔrnɛ sulʲiˈnɔvɔ] (German: Groß Born; Russian: Борне-Сулиново) is a town in north-western Poland, within the West Pomeranian Voivodeship. It is a capital of a separate gmina (municipality). As of June 2021, the town has a population of 5,008; the surrounding commune is inhabited by an additional 4,772 people. It is situated on the southern shore of Pile Lake in the region of Pomerania.

The town is notable for the fact that between 1945 and 1992 it was a secret Soviet military base that did not appear on any map, and was only transferred to Polish control in October 1992.

== History ==
The territory became part of the emerging Polish state under its first ruler Mieszko I around 967. Following the fragmentation of Poland into smaller duchies, it formed part of the Duchy of Pomerania, and later it also passed under Brandenburgian and Swedish rule. The town of Borne Sulinowo traces back its roots to two distinct villages founded in the area in the 16th century by local Pomeranian nobility. The modern town occupies the place of the village formerly known in Polish as Lipka and in German as Linde which in 1590 had 12 inhabitants. A nearby village named Großborn was home to 14 peasants.

Both villages developed very slowly. From the 18th century, the area was part of the Kingdom of Prussia. In the late 19th century, the area of the village of Linde was bought by the Prussian government and converted into a military training ground. However, it was not until the advent of Nazism in Germany that changes really arrived there. At the turn of the 19th and 20th centuries, it was inhabited by 112 people.

=== World War I and interbellum ===
During World War I, there was an outcamp of the Schneidemühl (Piła) German prisoner-of-war camp at Gross Born.

In 1933 the new German authorities bought all of the area and started the construction of a large military base, a training ground and various testing grounds there. The inhabitants were resettled and their homes razed to the ground. In place of the village of Linde, a small military garrison and a town was built. Paradoxically, it was given the name of the nearby village of Gross Born (which was also levelled), despite the fact that the actual namesake was located several kilometres to the south-east. All facilities were officially opened by Adolf Hitler on August 18, 1938. Soon afterwards the Artillery School of the Wehrmacht was moved there. Shortly before the outbreak of the joint German-Soviet invasion of Poland, which started World War II in 1939, the training grounds housed Heinz Guderian's XIX Army Corps.

=== World War II ===
In September 1939, it was one of the sites from which Germany launched the invasion of Poland and started World War II. During the later stages of World War II an artificial desert was built there for the units of Erwin Rommel's Afrika Korps (the other such training ground was established in the Błędów Desert near Olkusz). At the same time the area became part of the so-called Pomeranian Wall, a line of almost 1000 concrete bunkers guarding the pre-war Polish-German border and eastern approaches to Berlin.

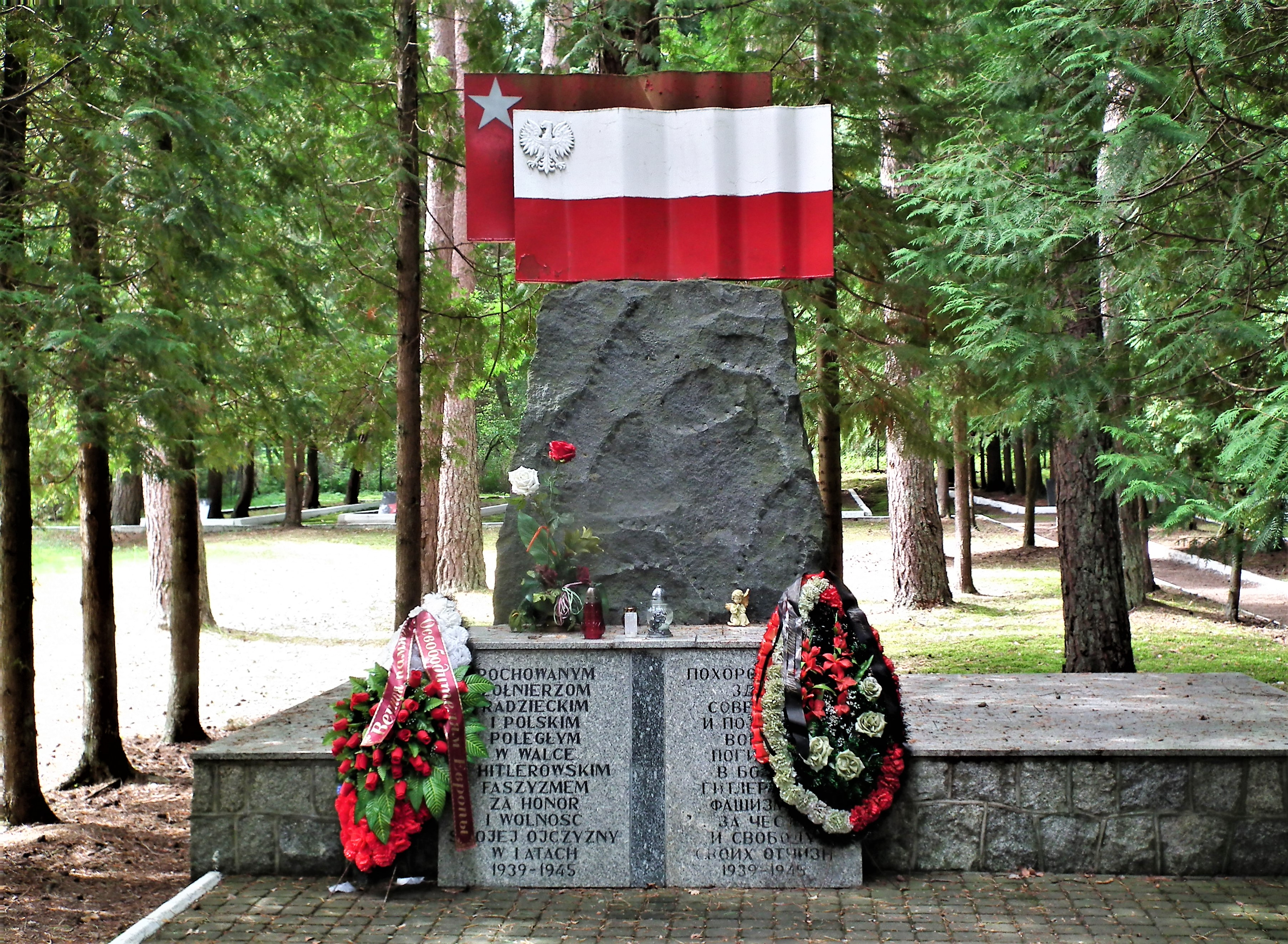
Military cemetery of Polish and Soviet soldiers fallen in World War II

In September 1939 in the military barracks a German POW camp was established for Polish soldiers, and later also for Russian, French and Yugoslav POWs-Stalag 302. Later it became an Oflag II-D. The Polish resistance organization Odra was active in the town and conducted espionage of German military activity. After January 22, 1945, the Pomeranian Rampart lines of defences around Gross-Born were manned by local artillery school NCOs and local fighting for the area started. Actual engagements with the Polish Army and the Red Army started in early February and lasted for more than a month. The town however was located behind the lines and survived the war almost undamaged.

=== Soviet military base ===
After the war, the area of two military bases and the town itself was taken over by the Red Army. There the Soviet military established one of the biggest military camps of the Northern Group of Forces. The town was excluded from Polish jurisdiction and erased from all maps, even though officially part of the People's Republic of Poland. In official documents of the surrounding communes, the area of Borne Sulinowo and the surrounding 180 square kilometres (69 sq mi) were called forest areas and remained a secret for almost 50 years.

=== Soviet withdrawal ===
Following the peaceful collapse of communism in Poland in 1989, an agreement was finally reached to withdraw the Soviet Army from Poland. The last of the large units, the 15,000 men strong 6th Guards Motor Rifle Division Vitebsk-Novgorod (later renamed the 166th Guards Motor Rifle Brigade of the Russian Federation) was withdrawn from Borne Sulinowo in October 1992. Poland regained full control of the town.

It was briefly controlled by the Polish Army, with a small contingent of the Polish 41st Mechanized Regiment stationed there. However, in April of the following year the Polish unit was withdrawn and the town was finally passed to civilian authorities – for the first time since the 19th century. On June 5, 1993, at 12 am, the town was officially opened to the public. On September 15 of the same year the Council of Ministers granted the town with a city charter and a process of settlement started. Most of the residents were Poles from the surrounding area and the Western Pomeranian region, however, people from all voivodeships of the country, either from urban or rural areas, moved to Borne Sulinowo, including a sizeable group of former miners from Upper Silesia, Polkowice, Lubin, Wałbrzych, Nowa Ruda and Boguszów-Gorce. Poles from abroad also settled in the town, namely repatriates from Kazakhstan and Ukraine, who were finally allowed to return to Poland after more than 50 years of forcible resettlement in the Soviet Union, and Polish anti-communist dissidents returning from Western Europe.

A monument to the victims of Nazi and Soviet totalitarianism was unveiled in 1998.

== International Gathering of Military Vehicles ==
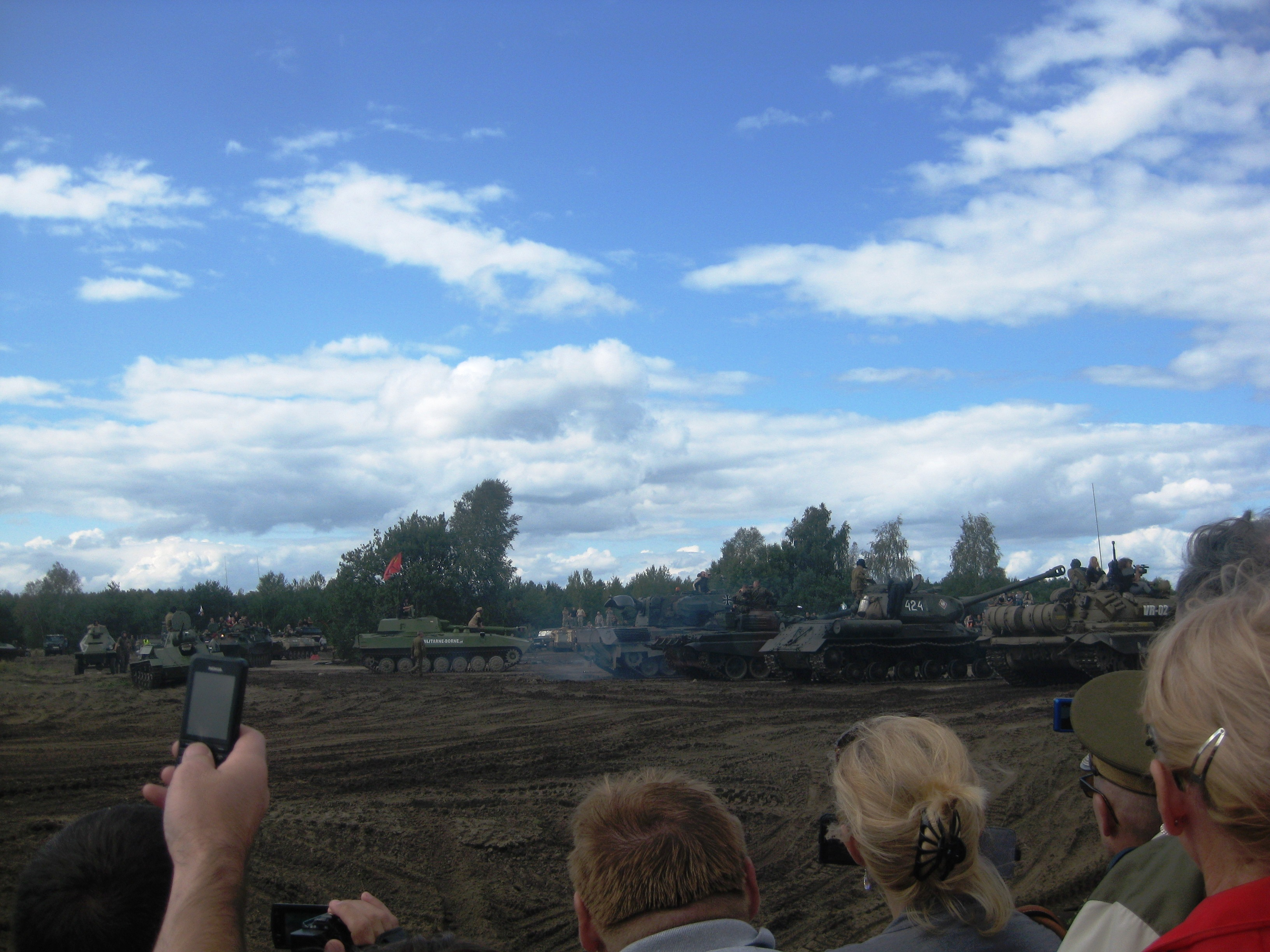
International Gathering of Military Vehicles in 2014

Since 2004, Borne Sulinowo has hosted the International Gathering of Military Vehicles (Polish: Międzynarodowy Zlot Pojazdów Militarnych). The event takes place over one weekend in August and has slowly grown into a general gathering of military enthusiasts and history buffs, with live concerts and cavalry shows for entertainment. The event offers attendees a chance to ride in a variety of vehicles, including tanks. Military surplus and historical items are sold in the bazaar. Many individuals choose to camp on-premises for the duration, and a large number wear military uniforms from different countries and time periods, World War II being the most popular.

== International relations ==
=== Twin towns — Sister cities ===
Borne Sulinowo is twinned with: Pszczyna, Ralsko, Krien

== Image gallery ==
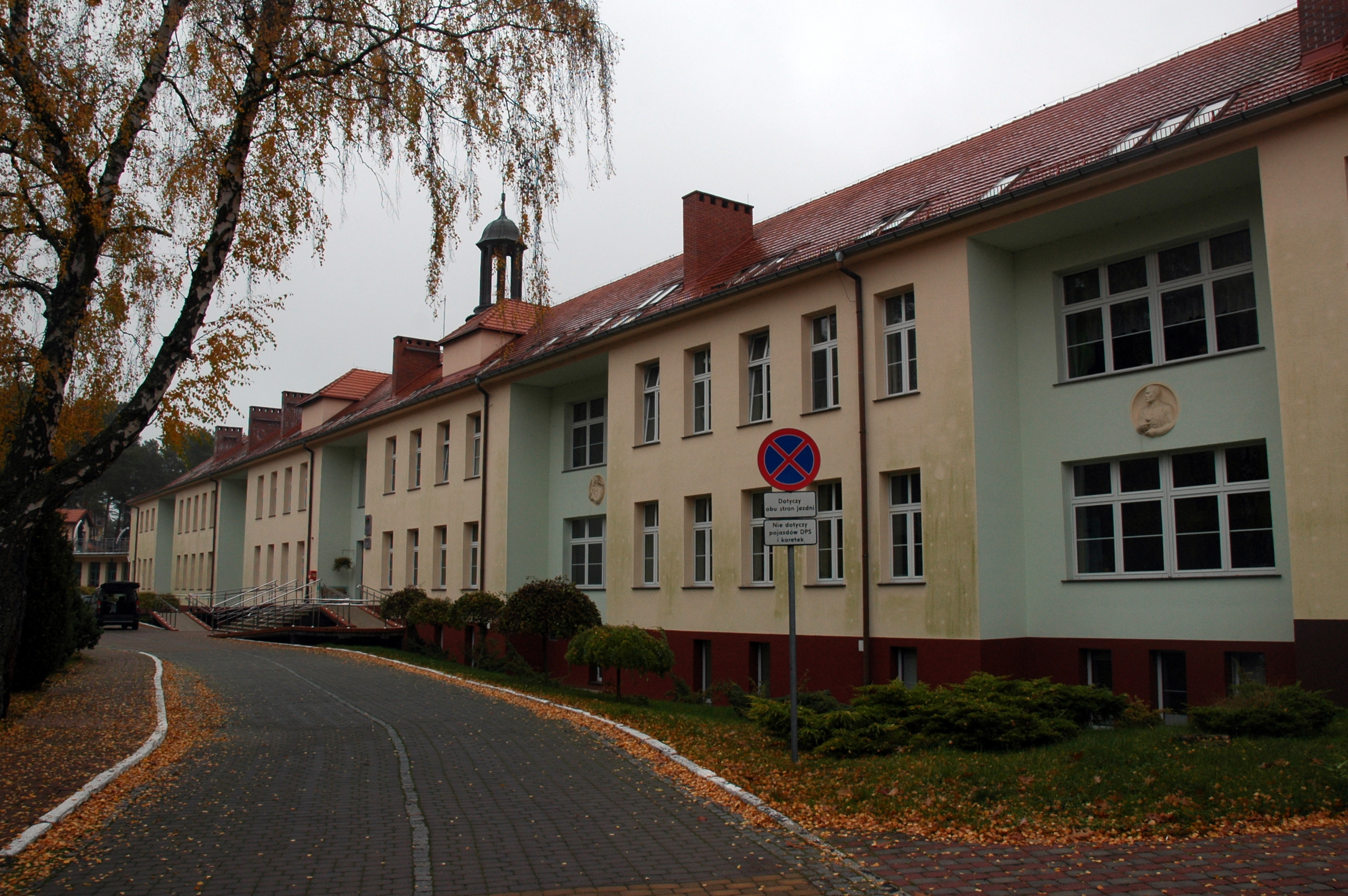
Municipal hospital

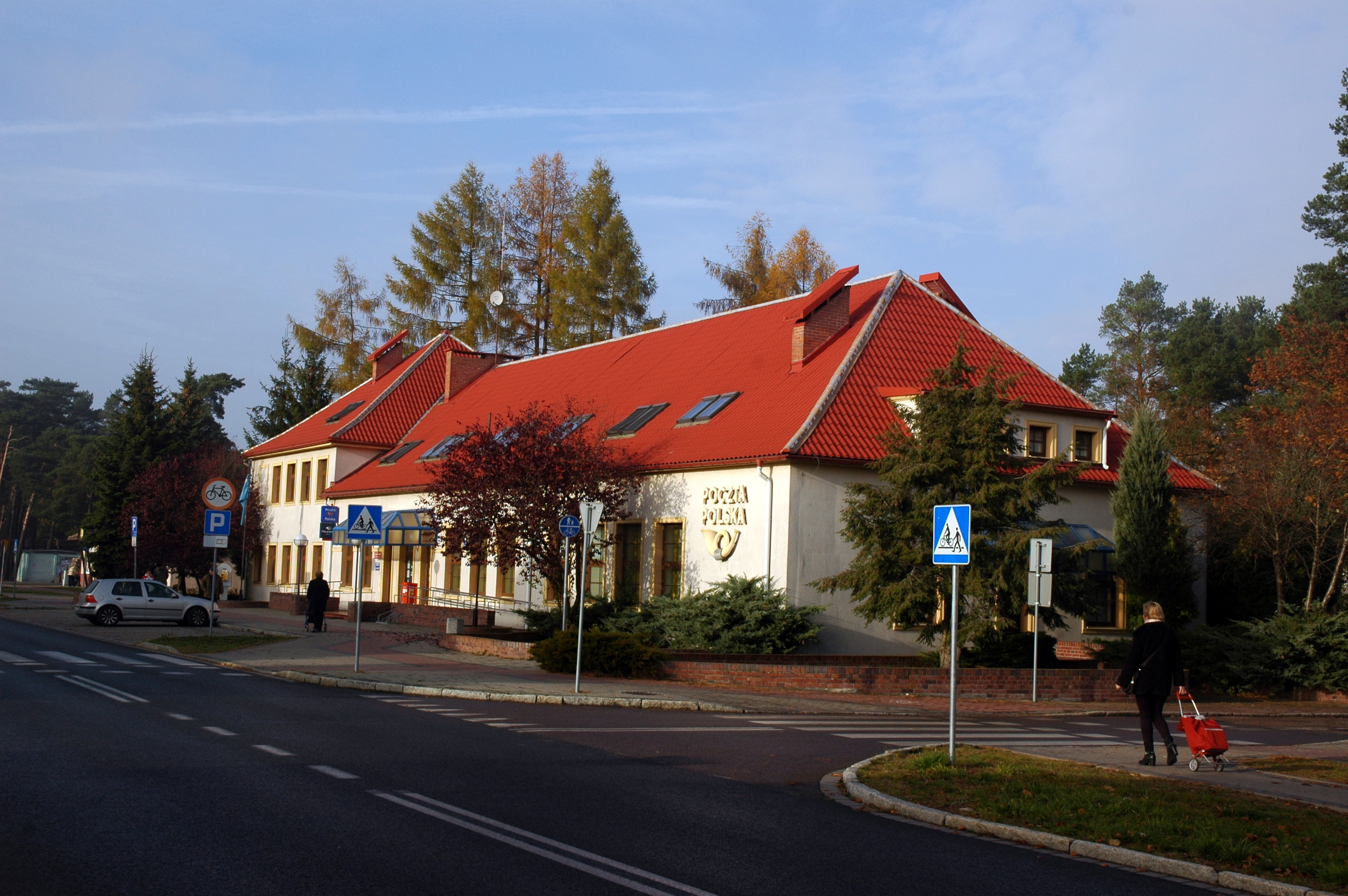
Post office

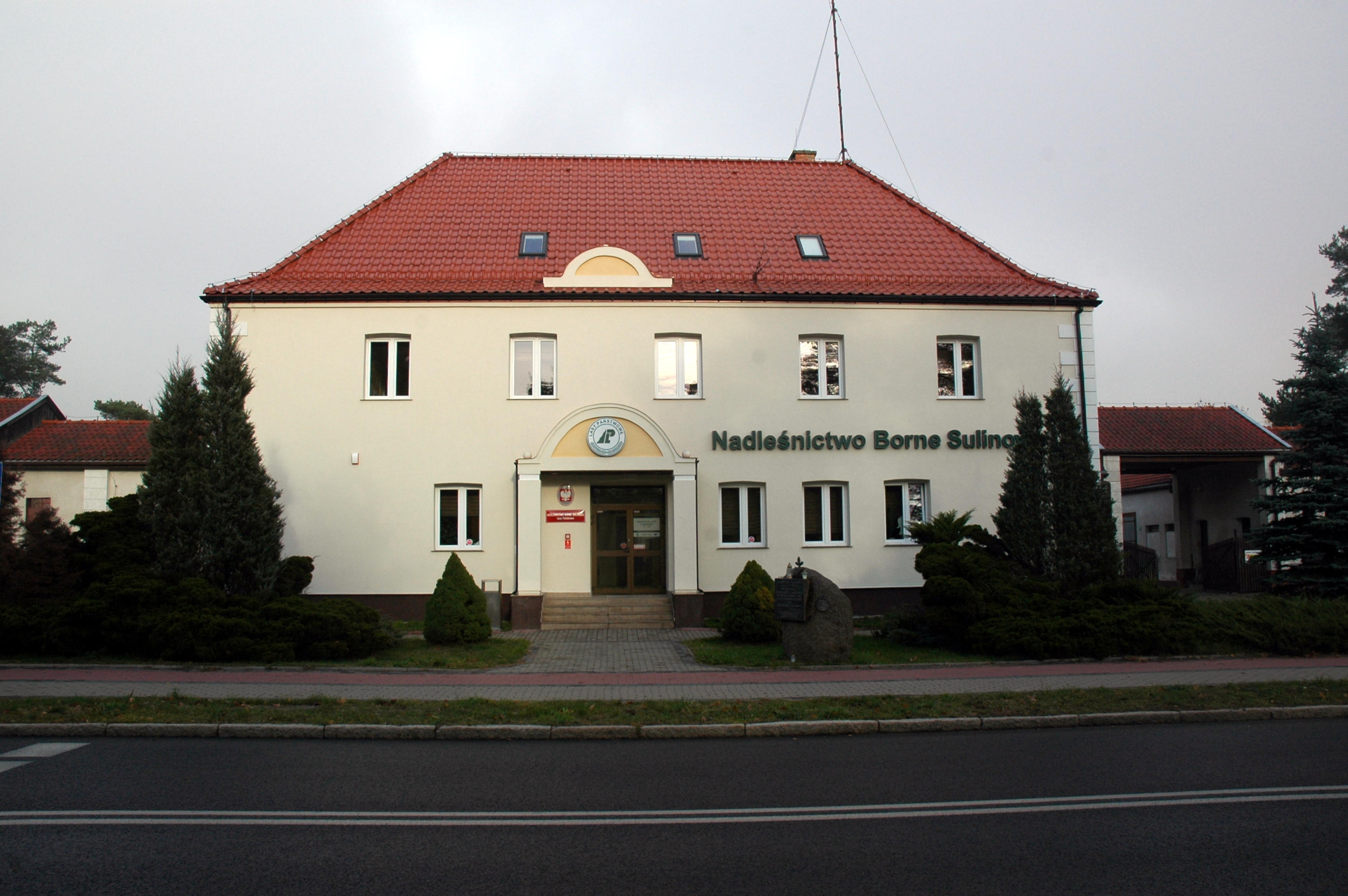
Forestry

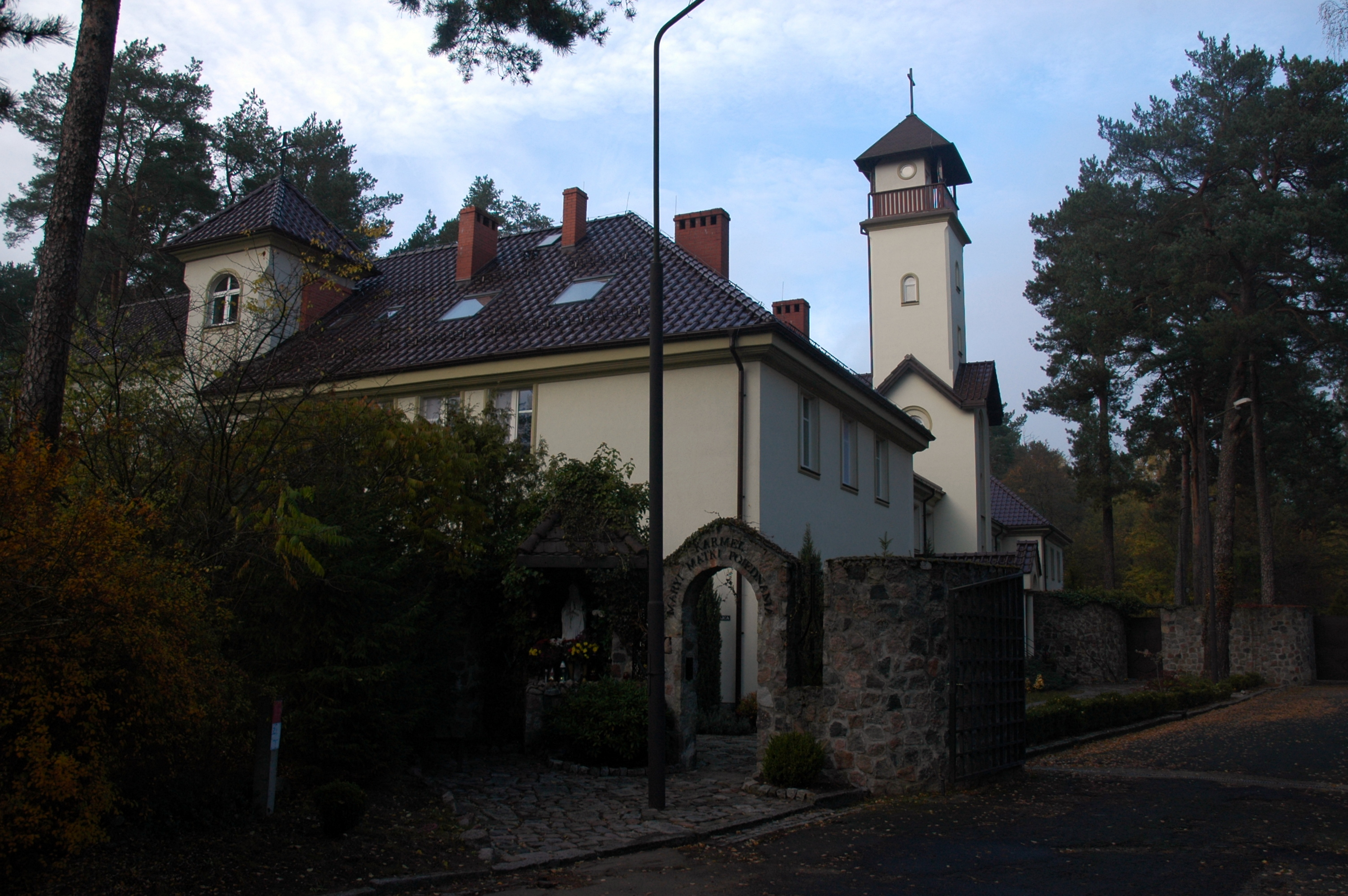
Carmelite nuns monastery

== See also ==
- Oflag II-D
- History of Poland (1945-1989)
