= Renata Rak =

Polish politician and teacher

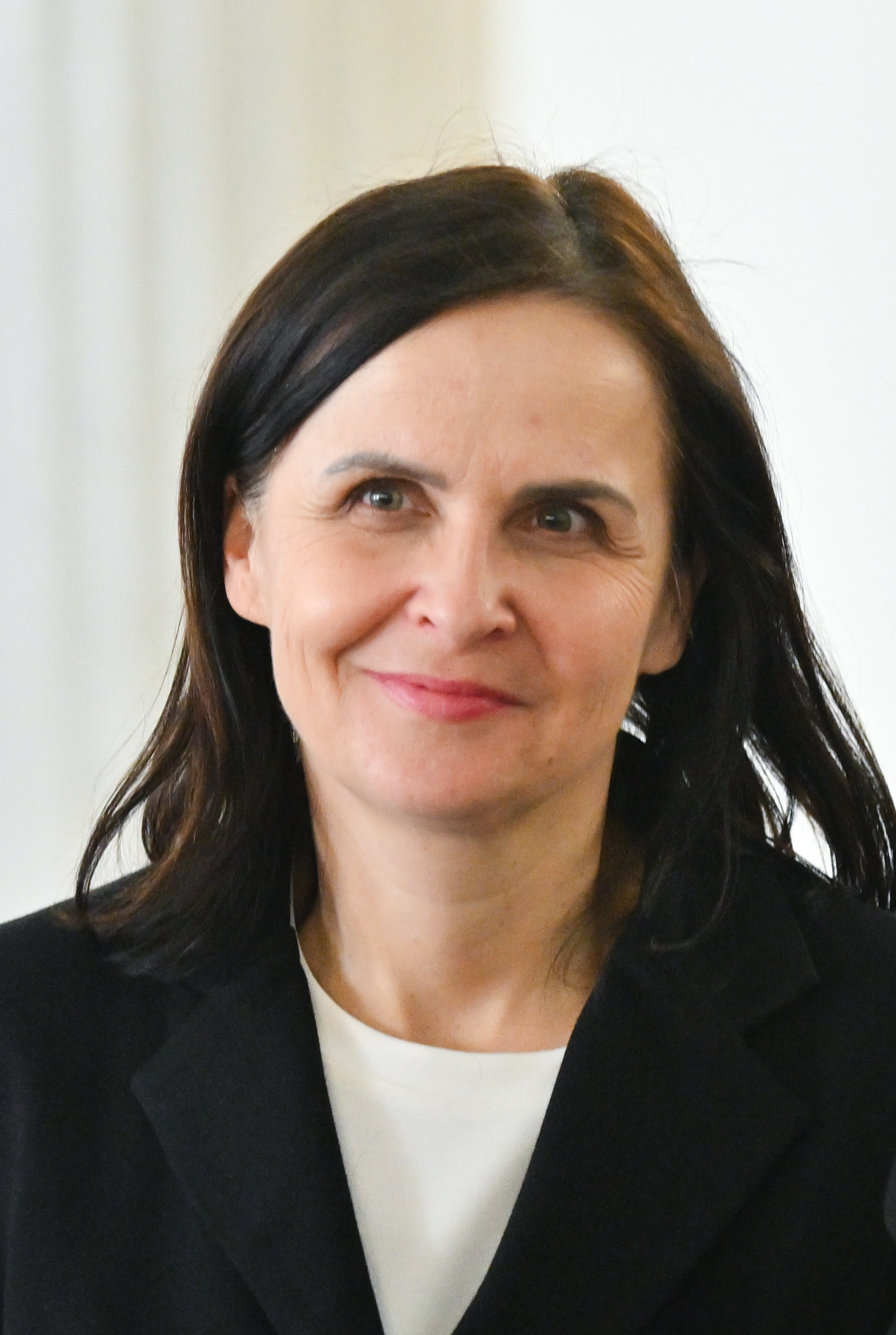
- Rak in 2026.

Member of Sejm of Poland
- Incumbent
- Assumed office 13 November 2023

Member of the Szczecinek County Council
- In office 2018–2023

Member of Szczecinek City Council
- In office 2016–2018

Personal details
- Born: Renata Urszula Woropaj; 29 June 1973 (age 53) Szczecinek, Poland
- Party: Civic Platform
- Spouse: Daniel Rak
- Education: University of Gdańsk
- Occupation: Politician; Teacher

Renata Urszula Rak (Polish: [rɛˈna.ta urˈʂu.la ˈrak]; née Woropaj, Polish: [vɔˈrɔ.paj]; born 29 June 1973) is a politician and teacher. Since 2023, she is a member of the Sejm of Poland. She belongs to the Civic Platform party.

== Biography ==
Renata Rak (née Woropaj) was born on 29 June 1973 in Szczecinek, Poland. In 1997 she graduated from the Faculty of Biology, Geography, and Oceanography of the University of Gdańsk with a degree in biology. She worked as a teacher in Szczecinek.

Rak was a member of a neighbourhood council of Trzesieka, and in 2014 she unsuccessfully run for an office of a member of the Szczecinek City Council as a member of the Civic Platform. She was elected to the office in 2016. In 2018, she was elected as a member of the Szczecinek County Council. In 2023 she was elected as a member of the Sejm of Poland.

== Private life ==
She is married to Daniel Rak, a politician, who from 2018 to 2024 was a mayor of Szczecinek.
