= Wągrodno, West Pomeranian Voivodeship =

Wągrodno
- Settlement
- Location within Poland
- Coordinates: 53°41′15″N 16°46′55″E
- Country: Poland
- Voivodeship: West Pomeranian
- County: Szczecinek
- Gmina: Szczecinek

Wągrodno [vɔnˈɡrɔdnɔ] is a settlement in the administrative district of Gmina Szczecinek, within Szczecinek County, West Pomeranian Voivodeship, in north-western Poland. It lies approximately 8 km (5 mi) south-east of Szczecinek and 149 km (93 mi) east of the regional capital Szczecin.

For the history of the region, see History of Pomerania.
