= Spore, West Pomeranian Voivodeship =

Spore
- Village
- Location within Poland
- Coordinates: 53°48′N 16°41′E
- Country: Poland
- Voivodeship: West Pomeranian
- County: Szczecinek
- Gmina: Szczecinek

Spore [ˈspɔrɛ] is a village in the administrative district of Gmina Szczecinek, within Szczecinek County, West Pomeranian Voivodeship, in north-western Poland. It lies approximately 10 km (6 mi) north of Szczecinek and 146 km (91 mi) east of the regional capital Szczecin.

== See also ==
History of Pomerania
