= Stare Wierzchowo =

Village in West Pomeranian Voivodeship, Poland

- Village
- Location within Poland
- Coordinates: 53°50′N 16°40′E
- Country: Poland
- Voivodeship: West Pomeranian
- County: Szczecinek
- Gmina: Szczecinek
- Population (approx.): 140

Stare Wierzchowo [ˈstarɛ vjɛʂˈxɔvɔ] (German: Sassenburg) is a village in the administrative district of Gmina Szczecinek, within Szczecinek County, West Pomeranian Voivodeship, in north-western Poland. It lies approximately 13 km (8 mi) north of Szczecinek and 146 km (91 mi) east of the regional capital Szczecin.

The village has an approximate population of 140.
