= Wilcze Laski =

- Village
- Location within Poland
- Coordinates: 53°37′N 16°43′E
- Country: Poland
- Voivodeship: West Pomeranian
- County: Szczecinek
- Gmina: Szczecinek
- Population: 300

Wilcze Laski (Polish pronunciation: [ˈviltʂɛ ˈlaskʲi]; formerly German: Wulfflatzke) is a village in the administrative district of Gmina Szczecinek, within Szczecinek County, West Pomeranian Voivodeship, in north-western Poland. It lies approximately 12 km (7 mi) south of Szczecinek and 143 km (89 mi) east of the regional capital Szczecin.

For the history of the region, see History of Pomerania.

The village has a population of 300.
