= Miękowo, Szczecinek County =

Miękowo
- Settlement
- Location within Poland
- Coordinates: 53°40′7″N 16°44′26″E
- Country: Poland
- Voivodeship: West Pomeranian
- County: Szczecinek
- Gmina: Szczecinek

Miękowo [mjɛnˈkɔvɔ] (formerly German: Münchowshof, or Münchershof) is a settlement in the administrative district of Gmina Szczecinek, within Szczecinek County, West Pomeranian Voivodeship, in north-western Poland. It lies approximately 7 km (4 mi) south-east of Szczecinek and 146 km (91 mi) east of the regional capital Szczecin.

For the history of the region, see History of Pomerania.
