= Brzostowo, Szczecinek County =

Brzostowo
- Village
- Location within Poland
- Coordinates: 53°44′22″N 16°37′56″E
- Country: Poland
- Voivodeship: West Pomeranian
- County: Szczecinek
- Gmina: Szczecinek
- Population: 10

Brzostowo [bʐɔsˈtɔvɔ] is a village in the administrative district of Gmina Szczecinek, within Szczecinek County, West Pomeranian Voivodeship, in north-western Poland. It lies approximately 5 km (3 mi) north-west of Szczecinek and 141 km (88 mi) east of the regional capital Szczecin.

For the history of the region, see History of Pomerania.

The village has a population of 10.
