= Dziki, West Pomeranian Voivodeship =

Dziki
- Village
- Location within Poland
- Coordinates: 53°38′N 16°41′E
- Country: Poland
- Voivodeship: West Pomeranian
- County: Szczecinek
- Gmina: Szczecinek

Dziki [ˈd͡ʑiki] is a village in the administrative district of Gmina Szczecinek, within Szczecinek County, West Pomeranian Voivodeship, in north-western Poland. It lies approximately 10 km (6 mi) south of Szczecinek and 142 km (88 mi) east of the regional capital Szczecin.

For the history of the region, see History of Pomerania.
