= Wielisławice, West Pomeranian Voivodeship =

Wielisławice
- Village
- Location within Poland
- Coordinates: 53°42′29″N 16°48′46″E
- Country: Poland
- Voivodeship: West Pomeranian
- County: Szczecinek
- Gmina: Szczecinek
- Population: 70

Wielisławice [vjɛliswaˈvit͡sɛ] is a village in the administrative district of Gmina Szczecinek, within Szczecinek County, West Pomeranian Voivodeship, in north-western Poland. It lies approximately 9 km (6 mi) east of Szczecinek and 151 km (94 mi) east of the regional capital Szczecin.

For the history of the region, see History of Pomerania.

The village has a population of 70.
