= Jadwiżyn, Szczecinek County =

Jadwiżyn
- Village
- Location within Poland
- Coordinates: 53°41′2″N 16°38′0″E
- Country: Poland
- Voivodeship: West Pomeranian
- County: Szczecinek
- Gmina: Szczecinek
- Population: 60

Jadwiżyn [jadˈviʐɨn] is a village in the administrative district of Gmina Szczecinek, within Szczecinek County, West Pomeranian Voivodeship, in north-western Poland. It lies approximately 5 km (3 mi) south-west of Szczecinek and 139 km (86 mi) east of the regional capital Szczecin.

For the history of the region, see History of Pomerania.

The village has a population of 60.
