= Gwda Wielka =

- Village
- Location within Poland
- Coordinates: 53°44′N 16°48′E
- Country: Poland
- Voivodeship: West Pomeranian
- County: Szczecinek
- Gmina: Szczecinek
- Population: 570

Gwda Wielka [ˈɡvda ˈvjɛlka] is a village in the administrative district of Gmina Szczecinek, within Szczecinek County, West Pomeranian Voivodeship, in north-western Poland. It lies approximately 8 km (5 mi) east of Szczecinek and 151 km (94 mi) east of the regional capital Szczecin.

For the history of the region, see History of Pomerania.

The village has a population of 570.
