= Nowe Gonne =

- Village
- Location within Poland
- Coordinates: 53°48′5″N 16°39′46″E
- Country: Poland
- Voivodeship: West Pomeranian
- County: Szczecinek
- Gmina: Szczecinek
- Population: 80

Nowe Gonne [ˈnɔvɛ ˈɡɔnnɛ] is a village in the administrative district of Gmina Szczecinek, within Szczecinek County, West Pomeranian Voivodeship, in north-western Poland. It lies approximately 10 km (6 mi) north of Szczecinek and 144 km (89 mi) east of the regional capital Szczecin.

For the history of the region, see History of Pomerania.

The village has a population of 80.
