= Sierszeniska =

- Settlement
- Location within Poland
- Coordinates: 53°40′26″N 16°45′48″E
- Country: Poland
- Voivodeship: West Pomeranian
- County: Szczecinek
- Gmina: Szczecinek

Sierszeniska [ɕɛrʂɛˈniska] is a settlement in the administrative district of Gmina Szczecinek, within Szczecinek County, West Pomeranian Voivodeship, in north-western Poland. It lies approximately 8 km (5 mi) south-east of Szczecinek and 147 km (91 mi) east of the regional capital Szczecin.
