= Kusowo, West Pomeranian Voivodeship =

Kusowo
- Village
- Location within Poland
- Coordinates: 53°48′N 16°33′E
- Country: Poland
- Voivodeship: West Pomeranian
- County: Szczecinek
- Gmina: Szczecinek

Kusowo [kuˈsɔvɔ] is a village in the administrative district of Gmina Szczecinek, within Szczecinek County, West Pomeranian Voivodeship, in north-western Poland. It lies approximately 13 km (8 mi) north-west of Szczecinek and 137 km (85 mi) east of the regional capital Szczecin.

== History ==
At the time of the foundation of the German Empire in 1871, the Kingdom of Prussia was the largest and dominant part of the empire. Pomerania was taken by the kingdom, and along with a few other places, and would later be called in Germany "Ostgebiete des deutschen Reiches" (Eastern territories of the German Empire).

Pomerelia (now Pomeranian Voivodeship) was handed over to Poland after the Greater Poland Uprising. It was, however, annexed by Nazi Germany during the Second World War. After the war, it was decided in the Potsdam Agreement that the Pomeranian Voivodeship would be returned to Poland.
