= Dobrogoszcz, Szczecinek County =

Dobrogoszcz
- Village
- Location within Poland
- Coordinates: 53°47′26″N 16°39′51″E
- Country: Poland
- Voivodeship: West Pomeranian
- County: Szczecinek
- Gmina: Szczecinek
- Population: 50

Dobrogoszcz [dɔˈbrɔɡɔʂt͡ʂ] is a village in the administrative district of Gmina Szczecinek, within Szczecinek County, West Pomeranian Voivodeship, in north-western Poland. It lies approximately 9 km (6 mi) north of Szczecinek and 144 km (89 mi) east of the regional capital Szczecin.

For the history of the region, see History of Pomerania.

The village has a population of 50.
