= Drawień =

- Village
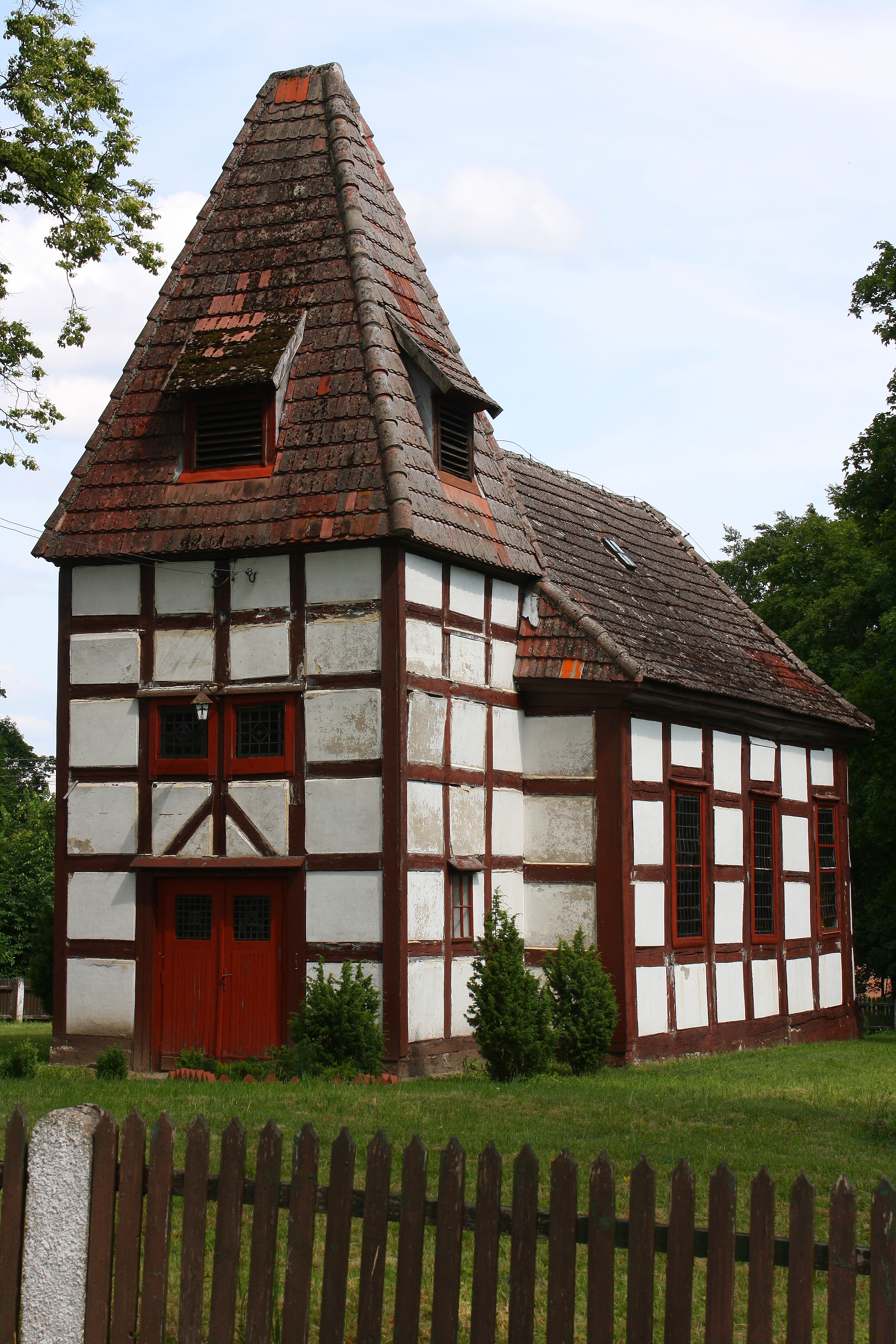
- Church of Mary of the Rosary

- Location within Poland
- Coordinates: 53°39′34″N 16°50′59″E
- Country: Poland
- Voivodeship: West Pomeranian
- County: Szczecinek
- Gmina: Szczecinek

Drawień [ˈdravjɛɲ] is a village in the administrative district of Gmina Szczecinek, within Szczecinek County, West Pomeranian Voivodeship, in north-western Poland. It lies approximately 14 km (9 mi) south-east of Szczecinek and 153 km (95 mi) east of the regional capital Szczecin.

Before 1648 the area was part of Duchy of Pomerania, 1648–1945 Prussia and Germany. For the history of the region, see History of Pomerania.

== Geography ==
The village is located in Farther Pomerania, west of the Gwda (Küddow), about 7 km (4.3 mi) southwest of Czarne (Hammerstein), 12 km (7.5 mi) southeast of Szczecinek (Neustettin), and 70 km (43 mi) southeast of Koszalin (Köslin).

== History ==
The settlement was mentioned in 1378, during a boundary regulation, as Heide Tribbene. It was the residence of the Lemmeke (Lembcke) family. Their son Klaves was lord of Tribbene from 1370 to 1440. He was succeeded by Peter to der Soltenische (Soltnitz), who was lord of Soltnitz and Tribbene from 1415 to 1500.

By the end of the 18th century, Trabehn was a feudal village with a chapel, four manors, and the Grünebüche manor. The Farther Pomeranian Lembcke family had been established there for several centuries. A document dated 14 January 1584 mentions Hans Lembcke and his sons Joachim and Friedrich as residents of Trabehn and Soltnitz. Many members of the family served as soldiers in the Prussian Army. According to a report by the government of Stettin dated 16 May 1794, the Trabehn estate was valued at 4,821 thalers in 1771.

During France's campaign against Prussia, the village was reportedly looted on 2 January 1807 by Polish troops allied with Napoleon I. According to Captain Lembcke, a retired officer who lived in Trabehn, the troops had crossed the border between West Prussia and Pomerania near Hammerstein.

Around 1896, the Trabehn estate, which included a distillery, was owned by the Bredow family of Bredow near Nauen.

On 1 April 1927, the Trabehn estate covered an area of 877 hectares (2,170 acres). On 16 June 1925, the estate district had a population of 262.

In the early 1930s, the municipality of Trabehn covered an area of 11.3 km^{2} (4.4 sq mi) and consisted of 46 inhabited houses in two settlements:

- Grünbüch
- Trabehn

Until 1945, Trabehn was a municipality in the Neustettin district of the Prussian Province of Pomerania within the German Reich. The village was the seat of the Trabehn Amt district.

In the spring of 1945, toward the end of World War II, the Red Army occupied the region. After the end of hostilities, Trabehn, together with the rest of Farther Pomerania, was placed under Polish administration by the Soviet occupation authorities. The Polish authorities administered the village under the name Drawień. Subsequently, the German population was expelled from the district by the Polish authorities.
