= Myślęcin, West Pomeranian Voivodeship =

Myślęcin
- Village
- Location within Poland
- Coordinates: 53°49′40″N 16°31′43″E
- Country: Poland
- Voivodeship: West Pomeranian
- County: Szczecinek
- Gmina: Szczecinek
- Population: 10

Myślęcin [mɨˈɕlɛnt͡ɕin] is a village in the administrative district of Gmina Szczecinek, within Szczecinek County, West Pomeranian Voivodeship, in north-western Poland. It lies approximately 16 km (10 mi) north-west of Szczecinek and 137 km (85 mi) east of the regional capital Szczecin.
