= Gmina Szczecinek =

Gmina Szczecinek Szczecinek Commune
- Gmina
- Flag Coat of arms
- Interactive map of Gmina Szczecinek
- Coordinates (Szczecinek): 53°43′N 16°41′E
- Country: Poland
- Voivodeship: West Pomeranian
- County: Szczecinek
- Seat: Szczecinek

Area
  - Total: 510.21 km^{2} (196.99 sq mi)

Population (2006)
  - Total: 10,171
  - Density: 19.935/km^{2} (51.631/sq mi)
- Website: http://www.szczecinekgmina.pl/

Gmina Szczecinek is a rural gmina (administrative district) in Szczecinek County, West Pomeranian Voivodeship, in north-western Poland. Its seat is the town of Szczecinek, although the town is not part of the territory of the gmina.

The gmina covers an area of 510.21 square kilometres (197.0 sq mi), and as of 2006 its total population is 10,171.

== Villages ==
Gmina Szczecinek contains the villages and settlements of:

- Andrzejewo
- Białe
- Brzeźno
- Brzostowo
- Buczek
- Dąbrowa
- Dąbrówka
- Dalęcinko
- Dalęcino
- Dębowo
- Dębrzyna
- Dobrogoszcz
- Drawień
- Drężno
- Dziki
- Gałówko
- Gałowo
- Glinno
- Glonowo
- Godzimierz
- Gołębiewo
- Gołonóg
- Grąbczyn
- Grąbczyński Młyn
- Grochowiska
- Gwda
- Gwda Mała
- Gwda Wielka
- Jadwiżyn
- Janowo
- Jelenino
- Kępno
- Krągłe
- Krasnobrzeg
- Kusowo
- Kwakówko
- Kwakowo
- Łabędź
- Łączka
- Letnica
- Lipnica
- Łozinka
- Łysa Góra
- Malechowo
- Marcelin
- Miękowo
- Mosina
- Myślęcin
- Niedźwiady
- Nizinne
- Nowe Gonne
- Omulna
- Opoczyska
- Orawka
- Orłowce
- Panigrodz
- Parnica
- Parsęcko
- Pękowo
- Pietrzykowo
- Płużyny
- Siedlice
- Sierszeniska
- Sitno
- Skalno
- Skotniki
- Sławęcice
- Sławęcin
- Spore
- Spotkanie
- Stare Wierzchowo
- Strzeżysław
- Świątki
- Tarnina
- Trzcinno
- Trzebiechowo
- Trzebujewo
- Trzesieka
- Turowo
- Wągrodno
- Węglewo
- Wielisławice
- Wilcze Laski
- Wojnowo
- Zamęcie
- Zielonowo
- Żółtnica

== Neighbouring gminas ==
Gmina Szczecinek is neighbored by the town of Szczecinek and by the gminas of Barwice, Biały Bór, Bobolice, Borne Sulinowo, Czarne, Grzmiąca, Okonek and Rzeczenica.
