= Dalęcino =

- Village
- Location within Poland
- Coordinates: 53°45′N 16°37′E
- Country: Poland
- Voivodeship: West Pomeranian
- County: Szczecinek
- Gmina: Szczecinek

Dalęcino [dalɛnˈt͡ɕinɔ] is a village in the administrative district of Gmina Szczecinek, within Szczecinek County, West Pomeranian Voivodeship, in north-western Poland. It lies approximately 6 km (4 mi) north-west of Szczecinek and 140 km (87 mi) east of the regional capital Szczecin.

For the history of the region, see History of Pomerania.
