= Grochowiska, West Pomeranian Voivodeship =

Grochowiska
- Village
- Location within Poland
- Coordinates: 53°42′52″N 16°47′14″E
- Country: Poland
- Voivodeship: West Pomeranian
- County: Szczecinek
- Gmina: Szczecinek
- Population: 100

Grochowiska [ɡrɔxɔˈviska] is a village in the administrative district of Gmina Szczecinek, within Szczecinek County, West Pomeranian Voivodeship, in north-western Poland. It lies approximately 7 km (4 mi) east of Szczecinek and 150 km (93 mi) east of the regional capital Szczecin.

For the history of the region, see History of Pomerania.

The village has a population of 100.
