= Sławęcice, West Pomeranian Voivodeship =

Sławęcice
- Village
- Location within Poland
- Coordinates: 53°53′12″N 16°36′5″E
- Country: Poland
- Voivodeship: West Pomeranian
- County: Szczecinek
- Gmina: Szczecinek
- Population: 70

Sławęcice [swavɛnˈt͡ɕit͡sɛ] is a village in the administrative district of Gmina Szczecinek, within Szczecinek County, West Pomeranian Voivodeship, in north-western Poland. It lies approximately 20 km (12 mi) north of Szczecinek and 143 km (89 mi) east of the regional capital Szczecin.

For the history of the region, see History of Pomerania.

The village has a population of 70.
