= Skotniki, Szczecinek County =

Skotniki
- Village
- Location within Poland
- Coordinates: 53°44′55″N 16°38′36″E
- Country: Poland
- Voivodeship: West Pomeranian
- County: Szczecinek
- Gmina: Szczecinek
- Population: 290

Skotniki [skɔtˈniki] is a village in the administrative district of Gmina Szczecinek, within Szczecinek County, West Pomeranian Voivodeship, in north-western Poland. It lies approximately 5 km (3 mi) north-west of Szczecinek and 142 km (88 mi) east of the regional capital Szczecin.

The village has a population of 290.

== See also ==
History of Pomerania
