= Dalęcinko =

- Settlement
- Location within Poland
- Coordinates: 53°47′5″N 16°40′14″E
- Country: Poland
- Voivodeship: West Pomeranian
- County: Szczecinek
- Gmina: Szczecinek

Dalęcinko [dalɛnˈt͡ɕinkɔ] is a settlement in the administrative district of Gmina Szczecinek, within Szczecinek County, West Pomeranian Voivodeship, in north-western Poland. It lies approximately 8 km (5 mi) north of Szczecinek and 144 km (89 mi) east of the regional capital Szczecin.

For the history of the region, see History of Pomerania.
