= Łączka, West Pomeranian Voivodeship =

Łączka
- Village
- Location within Poland
- Coordinates: 53°41′58″N 16°37′56″E
- Country: Poland
- Voivodeship: West Pomeranian
- County: Szczecinek
- Gmina: Szczecinek
- Population: 10

Łączka [ˈwɔnt͡ʂka] is a village in the administrative district of Gmina Szczecinek, within Szczecinek County, West Pomeranian Voivodeship, in north-western Poland. It lies approximately 4 km (2 mi) south-west of Szczecinek and 140 km (87 mi) east of the regional capital Szczecin.

For the history of the region, see History of Pomerania.

The village has a population of 10.
