= Grąbczyn =

- Village
- Location within Poland
- Coordinates: 53°52′N 16°38′E
- Country: Poland
- Voivodeship: West Pomeranian
- County: Szczecinek
- Gmina: Szczecinek

Grąbczyn [ˈɡrɔmpt͡ʂɨn] (German: Grumsdorf) is a village in the administrative district of Gmina Szczecinek, within Szczecinek County, West Pomeranian Voivodeship, in north-western Poland. It lies approximately 17 km (11 mi) north of Szczecinek and 145 km (90 mi) east of the regional capital Szczecin.

For the history of the region, see History of Pomerania.
