= Mosina, Szczecinek County =

Mosina
- Village
- Location within Poland
- Coordinates: 53°41′9″N 16°36′4″E
- Country: Poland
- Voivodeship: West Pomeranian
- County: Szczecinek
- Gmina: Szczecinek

Mosina [mɔˈɕina] (formerly German Mossin) is a village in the administrative district of Gmina Szczecinek, within Szczecinek County, West Pomeranian Voivodeship, in north-western Poland. It lies approximately 7 km (4 mi) south-west of Szczecinek and 137 km (85 mi) east of the regional capital Szczecin.

For the history of the region, see History of Pomerania.
