= Orawka, West Pomeranian Voivodeship =

Orawka
- Settlement
- Location within Poland
- Coordinates: 53°52′13″N 16°41′26″E
- Country: Poland
- Voivodeship: West Pomeranian
- County: Szczecinek
- Gmina: Szczecinek
- Time zone: UTC+1 (CET)
  - Summer (DST): UTC+2 (CEST)
- Vehicle registration: ZSZ

Orawka [ɔˈrafka] is a settlement in the administrative district of Gmina Szczecinek, within Szczecinek County, West Pomeranian Voivodeship, in north-western Poland. It lies approximately 18 km (11 mi) north of Szczecinek and 148 km (92 mi) east of the regional capital Szczecin.

== History ==
The area became part of the emerging Polish state in the 10th century. Following Poland's fragmentation, it formed part of the Duchy of Pomerania. From the 18th century it was part of the Kingdom of Prussia, and from 1871 it was also part of Germany. Following Germany's defeat in World War II in 1945, the area became again part of Poland.
