= Gwda Mała =

- Village
- Location within Poland
- Coordinates: 53°44′N 16°49′E
- Country: Poland
- Voivodeship: West Pomeranian
- County: Szczecinek
- Gmina: Szczecinek

Gwda Mała [ˈɡvda ˈmawa] is a village in the administrative district of Gmina Szczecinek, within Szczecinek County, West Pomeranian Voivodeship, in north-western Poland. It lies approximately 9 km (6 mi) east of Szczecinek and 152 km (94 mi) east of the regional capital Szczecin.

For the history of the region, see History of Pomerania.
