= Dębowo, West Pomeranian Voivodeship =

Dębowo
- Village
- Location within Poland
- Coordinates: 53°42′8″N 16°37′21″E
- Country: Poland
- Voivodeship: West Pomeranian
- County: Szczecinek
- Gmina: Szczecinek
- Population: 70

Dębowo ([dɛmˈbɔvɔ]; German: Gut Eichen) is a village in the administrative district of Gmina Szczecinek, within Szczecinek County, West Pomeranian Voivodeship, in north-western Poland. It lies approximately 5 km (3 mi) west of Szczecinek and 139 km (86 mi) east of the regional capital Szczecin.

For the history of the region, see History of Pomerania.

The village has a population of 70.
