= Omulna =

- Village
- Location within Poland
- Coordinates: 53°39′4″N 16°46′34″E
- Country: Poland
- Voivodeship: West Pomeranian
- County: Szczecinek
- Gmina: Szczecinek
- Population: 250

Omulna [ɔˈmulna] (German: Neuhof) is a village in the administrative district of Gmina Szczecinek, within Szczecinek County, West Pomeranian Voivodeship, in north-western Poland. It lies approximately 10 km (6 mi) south-east of Szczecinek and 148 km (92 mi) east of the regional capital Szczecin.

For the history of the region, see History of Pomerania.

The village has a population of 250.
