= Trzebiechowo, West Pomeranian Voivodeship =

Trzebiechowo
- Village
- Location within Poland
- Coordinates: 53°50′10″N 16°33′31″E
- Country: Poland
- Voivodeship: West Pomeranian
- County: Szczecinek
- Gmina: Szczecinek
- Population: 220

Trzebiechowo [tʂɛbjɛˈxɔvɔ] is a village in the administrative district of Gmina Szczecinek, within Szczecinek County, West Pomeranian Voivodeship, in north-western Poland. It lies approximately 16 km (10 mi) north-west of Szczecinek and 139 km (86 mi) east of the regional capital Szczecin.

For the history of the region, see History of Pomerania.

The village has a population of 220.
