= Gałowo, West Pomeranian Voivodeship =

Gałowo
- Village
- Location within Poland
- Coordinates: 53°44′N 16°41′E
- Country: Poland
- Voivodeship: West Pomeranian
- County: Szczecinek
- Gmina: Szczecinek

Gałowo [ɡaˈwɔvɔ] is a village in the administrative district of Gmina Szczecinek, within Szczecinek County, West Pomeranian Voivodeship, in northwestern Poland. It is approximately 2 km (1 mi) north of Szczecinek and 144 km (89 mi) east of the regional capital Szczecin.

For the region's history, see History of Pomerania.
