= Białe, West Pomeranian Voivodeship =

Białe
- Settlement
- Location within Poland
- Coordinates: 53°49′48″N 16°38′19″E
- Country: Poland
- Voivodeship: West Pomeranian
- County: Szczecinek
- Gmina: Szczecinek

Białe [ˈbjawɛ] is a settlement in the administrative district of Gmina Szczecinek, within Szczecinek County, West Pomeranian Voivodeship, in north-western Poland. It lies approximately 13 km (8 mi) north of Szczecinek and 144 km (89 mi) east of the regional capital Szczecin.

For the history of the region, see History of Pomerania.
