= Dąbrówka, Szczecinek County =

Dąbrówka
- Settlement
- Location within Poland
- Coordinates: 53°53′09″N 16°32′53″E
- Country: Poland
- Voivodeship: West Pomeranian
- County: Szczecinek
- Gmina: Szczecinek

Dąbrówka [dɔmˈbrufka] is a settlement in the administrative district of Gmina Szczecinek, within Szczecinek County, West Pomeranian Voivodeship, in north-western Poland.
