= Trzcinno =

Trzcinno may refer to the following places:

- Trzcinno, Pomeranian Voivodeship (north Poland)
- Trzcinno, Szczecinek County in West Pomeranian Voivodeship (north-west Poland)
- Trzcinno, Wałcz County in West Pomeranian Voivodeship (north-west Poland)
