= Orłowce, West Pomeranian Voivodeship =

Orłowce
- Settlement
- Location within Poland
- Coordinates: 53°52′19″N 16°32′49″E
- Country: Poland
- Voivodeship: West Pomeranian
- County: Szczecinek
- Gmina: Szczecinek

Orłowce [ɔrˈwɔft͡sɛ] is a settlement in the administrative district of Gmina Szczecinek, within Szczecinek County, West Pomeranian Voivodeship, in north-western Poland.

For the history of the region, see History of Pomerania.
