= Trzcinno, Szczecinek County =

Trzcinno
- Village
- Location within Poland
- Coordinates: 53°46′3″N 16°40′12″E
- Country: Poland
- Voivodeship: West Pomeranian
- County: Szczecinek
- Gmina: Szczecinek
- Population: 230

Trzcinno [ˈtʂt͡ɕinnɔ] is a village in the administrative district of Gmina Szczecinek, within Szczecinek County, West Pomeranian Voivodeship, in north-western Poland. It lies approximately 6 km (4 mi) north of Szczecinek and 144 km (89 mi) east of the regional capital Szczecin.

For the history of the region, see History of Pomerania.

The village has a population of 230.
