= Dąbrowa, Szczecinek County =

Dąbrowa
- Village
- Location within Poland
- Coordinates: 53°53′11″N 16°32′53″E
- Country: Poland
- Voivodeship: West Pomeranian
- County: Szczecinek
- Gmina: Szczecinek

Dąbrowa [dɔmˈbrɔva] is a village in the administrative district of Gmina Szczecinek, within Szczecinek County, West Pomeranian Voivodeship, in north-western Poland.
