= Siedlice =

Siedlice may refer to the following places in Poland:

- Siedlice, Opole Voivodeship (south-west Poland)
- Siedlice, Łobez County in West Pomeranian Voivodeship (north-west Poland)
- Siedlice, Police County in West Pomeranian Voivodeship (north-west Poland)
- Siedlice, Szczecinek County in West Pomeranian Voivodeship (north-west Poland)

== See also ==
- Siedlce
