= Wojnowo, West Pomeranian Voivodeship =

Wojnowo
- Village
- Location within Poland
- Coordinates: 53°38′05″N 16°50′44″E
- Country: Poland
- Voivodeship: West Pomeranian
- County: Szczecinek
- Gmina: Szczecinek

Wojnowo [vɔi̯ˈnɔvɔ] is a village in the administrative district of Gmina Szczecinek, within Szczecinek County, West Pomeranian Voivodeship, in north-western Poland.
