= Kwakowo, West Pomeranian Voivodeship =

Kwakowo
- Village
- Location within Poland
- Coordinates: 53°51′06″N 16°33′34″E
- Country: Poland
- Voivodeship: West Pomeranian
- County: Szczecinek
- Gmina: Szczecinek

Kwakowo [kfaˈkɔvɔ] is a village in the administrative district of Gmina Szczecinek, within Szczecinek County, West Pomeranian Voivodeship, in north-western Poland.
