= Parnica, Szczecinek County =

Parnica
- Settlement
- Location within Poland
- Coordinates: 53°52′19″N 16°31′49″E
- Country: Poland
- Voivodeship: West Pomeranian
- County: Szczecinek
- Gmina: Szczecinek

Parnica [parˈnit͡sa] is a settlement in the administrative district of Gmina Szczecinek, within Szczecinek County, West Pomeranian Voivodeship, in north-western Poland.
