= Łysa Góra, West Pomeranian Voivodeship =

Łysa Góra
- Settlement
- Location within Poland
- Coordinates: 53°53′11″N 16°42′32″E
- Country: Poland
- Voivodeship: West Pomeranian
- County: Szczecinek
- Gmina: Szczecinek
- Time zone: UTC+01:00 (CET)
  - Summer (DST): UTC+02:00 (CEST)

Łysa Góra [ˈwɨsa ˈɡura] is a settlement in the administrative district of Gmina Szczecinek, within Szczecinek County, West Pomeranian Voivodeship, in north-western Poland.

For the history of the region, see History of Pomerania.
