= Buczek, Szczecinek County =

Buczek
- Settlement
- Location within Poland
- Coordinates: 53°40′49″N 16°45′48″E
- Country: Poland
- Voivodeship: West Pomeranian
- County: Szczecinek
- Gmina: Szczecinek

Buczek [ˈbut͡ʂɛk] is a settlement in the administrative district of Gmina Szczecinek, within Szczecinek County, West Pomeranian Voivodeship, in north-western Poland. It lies approximately 7 km (4 mi) south-east of Szczecinek and 148 km (92 mi) east of the regional capital Szczecin.

For the history of the region, see History of Pomerania.
