= Niedźwiady, West Pomeranian Voivodeship =

Niedźwiady
- Settlement
- Location within Poland
- Coordinates: 53°53′19″N 16°33′42″E
- Country: Poland
- Voivodeship: West Pomeranian
- County: Szczecinek
- Gmina: Szczecinek

Niedźwiady [ɲɛd͡ʑˈvjadɨ] is a settlement in the administrative district of Gmina Szczecinek, within Szczecinek County, West Pomeranian Voivodeship, in northwest Poland.

For the history of the region, see History of Pomerania.
