= Opoczyska =

- Village
- Location within Poland
- Coordinates: 53°44′09″N 16°39′14″E
- Country: Poland
- Voivodeship: West Pomeranian
- County: Szczecinek
- Gmina: Szczecinek

Opoczyska [ɔpɔˈt͡ʂɨska] is a village in the administrative district of Gmina Szczecinek, within Szczecinek County, West Pomeranian Voivodeship, in north-western Poland.
