= Glonowo =

- Settlement
- Country: Poland
- Voivodeship: West Pomeranian
- County: Szczecinek
- Gmina: Szczecinek
- Time zone: UTC+01:00 (CET)
  - Summer (DST): UTC+02:00 (CEST)

Glonowo [ɡlɔˈnɔvɔ] is a settlement in the administrative district of Gmina Szczecinek, within Szczecinek County, West Pomeranian Voivodeship, in north-western Poland.
