= Spotkanie =

- Settlement
- Location within Poland
- Coordinates: 53°38′05″N 16°43′10″E
- Country: Poland
- Voivodeship: West Pomeranian
- County: Szczecinek
- Gmina: Szczecinek

Spotkanie ([spɔtˈkaɲɛ], lit. "meeting") is a settlement in the administrative district of Gmina Szczecinek, within Szczecinek County, West Pomeranian Voivodeship, in north-western Poland.
