= Parsęcko =

- Village
- Location within Poland
- Coordinates: 53°43′N 16°35′E
- Country: Poland
- Voivodeship: West Pomeranian
- County: Szczecinek
- Gmina: Szczecinek

Parsęcko [parˈsɛnt͡skɔ] (German Persanzig) is a village in the administrative district of Gmina Szczecinek, within Szczecinek County, West Pomeranian Voivodeship, in north-western Poland. It lies approximately 7 km (4 mi) west of Szczecinek and 137 km (85 mi) east of the regional capital Szczecin.

Before 1648 the area was part of Duchy of Pomerania, 1648-1945 Prussia and Germany. For the history of the region, see History of Pomerania. Persanzig Manor being owned by the Bayer family.
