= Brzeźno, Gmina Szczecinek =

Brzeźno
- Village
- Location within Poland
- Coordinates: 53°48′43″N 16°36′36″E
- Country: Poland
- Voivodeship: West Pomeranian
- County: Szczecinek
- Gmina: Szczecinek

Brzeźno [ˈbʐɛʑnɔ] is a village in the administrative district of Gmina Szczecinek, within Szczecinek County, West Pomeranian Voivodeship, in north-western Poland.
