= Nizinne =

- Village
- Location within Poland
- Coordinates: 53°46′46″N 16°36′13″E
- Country: Poland
- Voivodeship: West Pomeranian
- County: Szczecinek
- Gmina: Szczecinek

Nizinne [niˈʑinnɛ] is a village in the administrative district of Gmina Szczecinek, within Szczecinek County, West Pomeranian Voivodeship, in north-western Poland.
