= Grąbczyński Młyn =

- Settlement
- Location within Poland
- Coordinates: 53°53′49″N 16°37′18″E
- Country: Poland
- Voivodeship: West Pomeranian
- County: Szczecinek
- Gmina: Szczecinek

Grąbczyński Młyn [ɡrɔmpˈt͡ʂɨɲski ˈmwɨn] is a settlement in the administrative district of Gmina Szczecinek, within Szczecinek County, West Pomeranian Voivodeship, in north-western Poland.
