= Kwakówko =

- Settlement
- Location within Poland
- Coordinates: 53°50′53″N 16°32′40″E
- Country: Poland
- Voivodeship: West Pomeranian
- County: Szczecinek
- Gmina: Szczecinek

Kwakówko [kfaˈkufkɔ] is a settlement in the administrative district of Gmina Szczecinek, within Szczecinek County, West Pomeranian Voivodeship, in north-western Poland.
