= Panigrodz =

- Settlement
- Location within Poland
- Coordinates: 52°57′25″N 17°24′00″E
- Country: Poland
- Voivodeship: West Pomeranian
- County: Szczecinek
- Gmina: Szczecinek

Panigrodz [paˈniɡrɔt͡s] is a settlement in the administrative district of Gmina Szczecinek, within Szczecinek County, West Pomeranian Voivodeship, in north-western Poland.
