= Strzeżysław, West Pomeranian Voivodeship =

Strzeżysław
- Settlement
- Location within Poland
- Coordinates: 53°52′27″N 16°31′06″E
- Country: Poland
- Voivodeship: West Pomeranian
- County: Szczecinek
- Gmina: Szczecinek

Strzeżysław [stʂɛˈʐɨswaf] is a settlement in the administrative district of Gmina Szczecinek, within Szczecinek County, West Pomeranian Voivodeship, in north-western Poland.

For the history of the region, see History of Pomerania.
