= Dębrzyna, West Pomeranian Voivodeship =

Dębrzyna
- Settlement
- Location within Poland
- Coordinates: 53°45′N 16°37′E
- Country: Poland
- Voivodeship: West Pomeranian
- County: Szczecinek
- Gmina: Szczecinek

Dębrzyna [dɛmˈbʐɨna] is a settlement in the administrative district of Gmina Szczecinek, within Szczecinek County, West Pomeranian Voivodeship, in north-western Poland.
