= Pękowo, West Pomeranian Voivodeship =

Pękowo
- Settlement
- Location within Poland
- Coordinates: 52°45′04″N 20°59′03″E
- Country: Poland
- Voivodeship: West Pomeranian
- County: Szczecinek
- Gmina: Szczecinek

Pękowo [pɛnˈkɔvɔ] is a settlement in the administrative district of Gmina Szczecinek, within Szczecinek County, West Pomeranian Voivodeship, in north-western Poland.

For the history of the region, see History of Pomerania.
