= Gołonóg, West Pomeranian Voivodeship =

Gołonóg
- Settlement
- Country: Poland
- Voivodeship: West Pomeranian
- County: Szczecinek
- Gmina: Szczecinek

Gołonóg [ɡɔˈwɔnuk] is a settlement in the administrative district of Gmina Szczecinek, within Szczecinek County, West Pomeranian Voivodeship, in north-western Poland.

For the history of the region, see History of Pomerania.
