= Turowo, West Pomeranian Voivodeship =

Turowo
- Village
- Location within Poland
- Coordinates: 53°39′N 16°43′E
- Country: Poland
- Voivodeship: West Pomeranian
- County: Szczecinek
- Gmina: Szczecinek

Population
  - Total: 950
- Time zone: UTC+1 (CET)
  - Summer (DST): UTC+2 (CEST)
- Vehicle registration: ZSZ

Turowo [tuˈrɔvɔ] (German: Thurow) is a village in the administrative district of Gmina Szczecinek, within Szczecinek County, West Pomeranian Voivodeship, in north-western Poland. It lies approximately 8 km (5 mi) south of Szczecinek and 144 km (89 mi) east of the regional capital Szczecin.

== History ==
The area became part of the emerging Polish state under its first historic ruler Mieszko I by c. 967. Following the fragmentation of Poland into smaller duchies, it formed part of the Duchy of Pomerania. From the 18th century, it formed part of the Kingdom of Prussia, and from 1871 to 1945 it was also part of Germany.
