= Malechowo, Szczecinek County =

Malechowo
- Settlement
- Location within Poland
- Coordinates: 53°49′31″N 16°41′17″E
- Country: Poland
- Voivodeship: West Pomeranian
- County: Szczecinek
- Gmina: Szczecinek

Malechowo [malɛˈxɔvɔ] is a settlement in the administrative district of Gmina Szczecinek, within Szczecinek County, West Pomeranian Voivodeship, in north-western Poland.
