= Żółtnica =

- Village
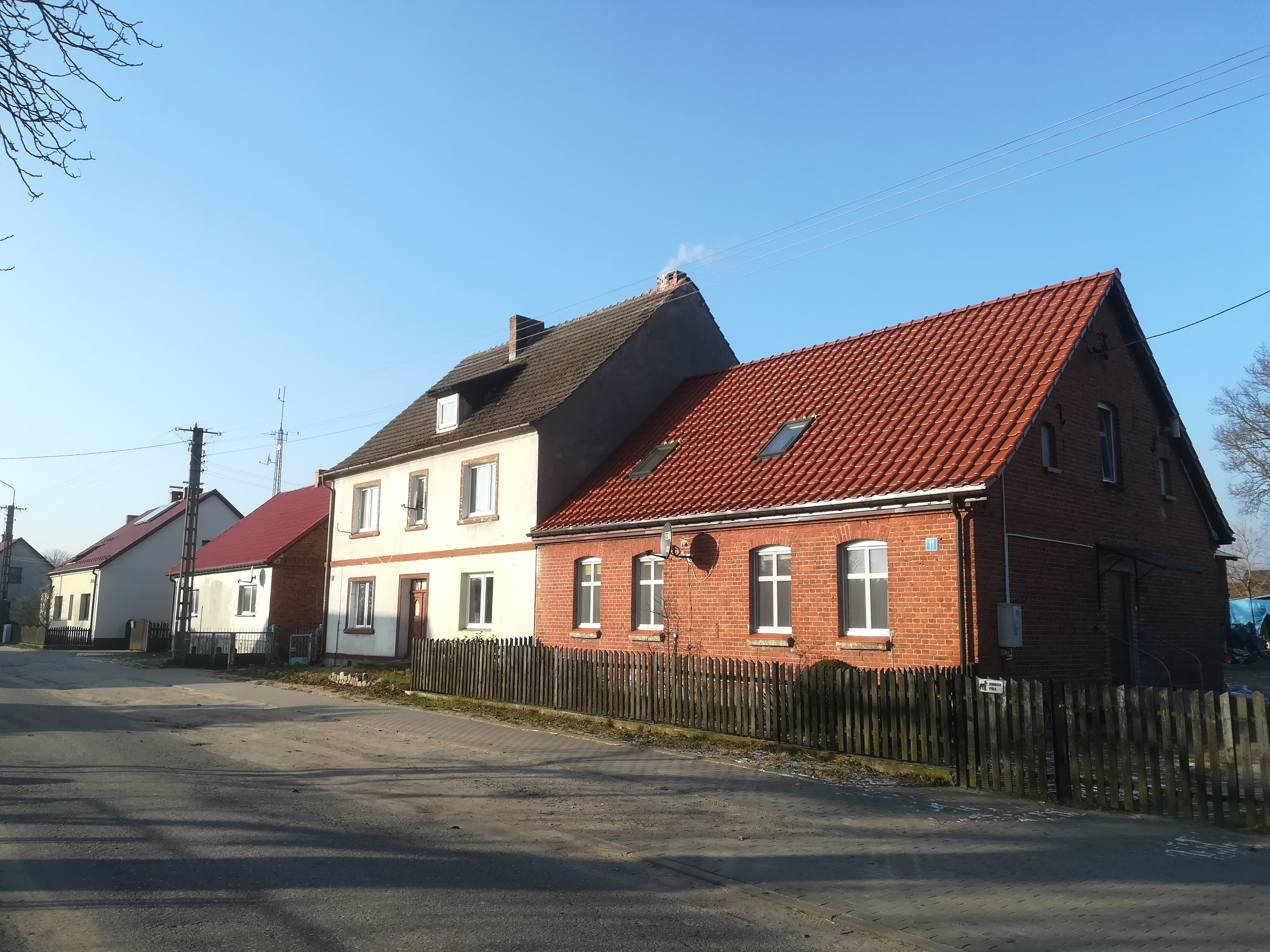

- Location within Poland
- Coordinates: 53°40′N 16°48′E
- Country: Poland
- Voivodeship: West Pomeranian
- County: Szczecinek
- Gmina: Szczecinek

Population
  - Total: 590
- Time zone: UTC+1 (CET)
  - Summer (DST): UTC+2 (CEST)
- Postal code: 78-400
- Vehicle registration: ZSZ

Żółtnica ([ʐuu̯tˈnit͡sa]: German: Soltnitz) is a village in the administrative district of Gmina Szczecinek, within Szczecinek County, West Pomeranian Voivodeship, in north-western Poland. It lies approximately 10 km (6 mi) south-east of Szczecinek and 150 km (93 mi) east of the regional capital Szczecin.

The village has a population of 590.

== History ==
The area became part of the Duchy of Poland under its first ruler Mieszko I around 967, and following Poland's fragmentation it formed part of the Duchy of Pomerania, and then passed under the suzerainty of Denmark and the Holy Roman Empire. From 1701 it formed part of the Kingdom of Prussia. Two Polish citizens were murdered by Nazi Germany in the village during World War II.
