= Krasnobrzeg, West Pomeranian Voivodeship =

Krasnobrzeg
- Village
- Location within Poland
- Coordinates: 53°48′06″N 16°37′21″E
- Country: Poland
- Voivodeship: West Pomeranian
- County: Szczecinek
- Gmina: Szczecinek

Krasnobrzeg [krasˈnɔbʐɛk] is a village in the administrative district of Gmina Szczecinek, within Szczecinek County, West Pomeranian Voivodeship, in north-western Poland.
