= Krągłe, West Pomeranian Voivodeship =

Krągłe
- Village
- Location within Poland
- Coordinates: 53°52′38″N 16°33′28″E
- Country: Poland
- Voivodeship: West Pomeranian
- County: Szczecinek
- Gmina: Szczecinek

Krągłe [ˈkrɔnɡwɛ] (formerly German Bernsdorf, Neustettin within Landkreis Neustettin) is a village in the administrative district of Gmina Szczecinek, within Szczecinek County, West Pomeranian Voivodeship, in north-western Poland.

For the history of the region, see History of Pomerania.
