= Gołębiewo, West Pomeranian Voivodeship =

Gołębiewo
- Settlement
- Location within Poland
- Coordinates: 53°40′31″N 16°51′56″E
- Country: Poland
- Voivodeship: West Pomeranian
- County: Szczecinek
- Gmina: Szczecinek
- Time zone: UTC+1 (CET)
  - Summer (DST): UTC+2 (CEST)
- Vehicle registration: ZSZ

Gołębiewo [ɡɔwɛmˈbjɛvɔ] is a settlement in the administrative district of Gmina Szczecinek, within Szczecinek County, West Pomeranian Voivodeship, in north-western Poland.
