= Zamęcie, Gmina Szczecinek =

Zamęcie
- Settlement
- Location within Poland
- Coordinates: 53°39′10″N 16°35′49″E
- Country: Poland
- Voivodeship: West Pomeranian
- County: Szczecinek
- Gmina: Szczecinek

Zamęcie [zaˈmɛnt͡ɕɛ] is a settlement in the administrative district of Gmina Szczecinek, within Szczecinek County, West Pomeranian Voivodeship, in north-western Poland.
