= Eckart Afheldt =

German general

- Born: 15 August 1921; Neustettin
- Died: 3 December 1999 (aged 78); Munich
- Military career
- Allegiance: Nazi Germany; West Germany
- Branch: German Army
- Service years: 1939–45; 1956–81
- Rank: Brigadegeneral
- Units: Brandenburg Division; 4th Panzergrenadier Division (Bundeswehr)
- Conflicts: World War II
- Awards: Knight's Cross of the Iron Cross

Eckart Afheldt (15 August 1921 – 3 December 1999) was a German general in the Bundeswehr. During World War II, he served as an officer in the Wehrmacht and was a recipient of the Knight's Cross of the Iron Cross of Nazi Germany. He joined the Bundeswehr in 1956 and retired in 1981 as a Brigadegeneral.

== Awards and decorations ==
- Iron Cross (1939) 2nd Class (19 May 1941) & 1st Class (16 October 1942)
- Knight's Cross of the Iron Cross on 17 March 1945 as Oberleutnant and commander of II./Jäger-Regiment 2 "Brandenburg"
