= Marcelin, West Pomeranian Voivodeship =

Marcelin
- Village
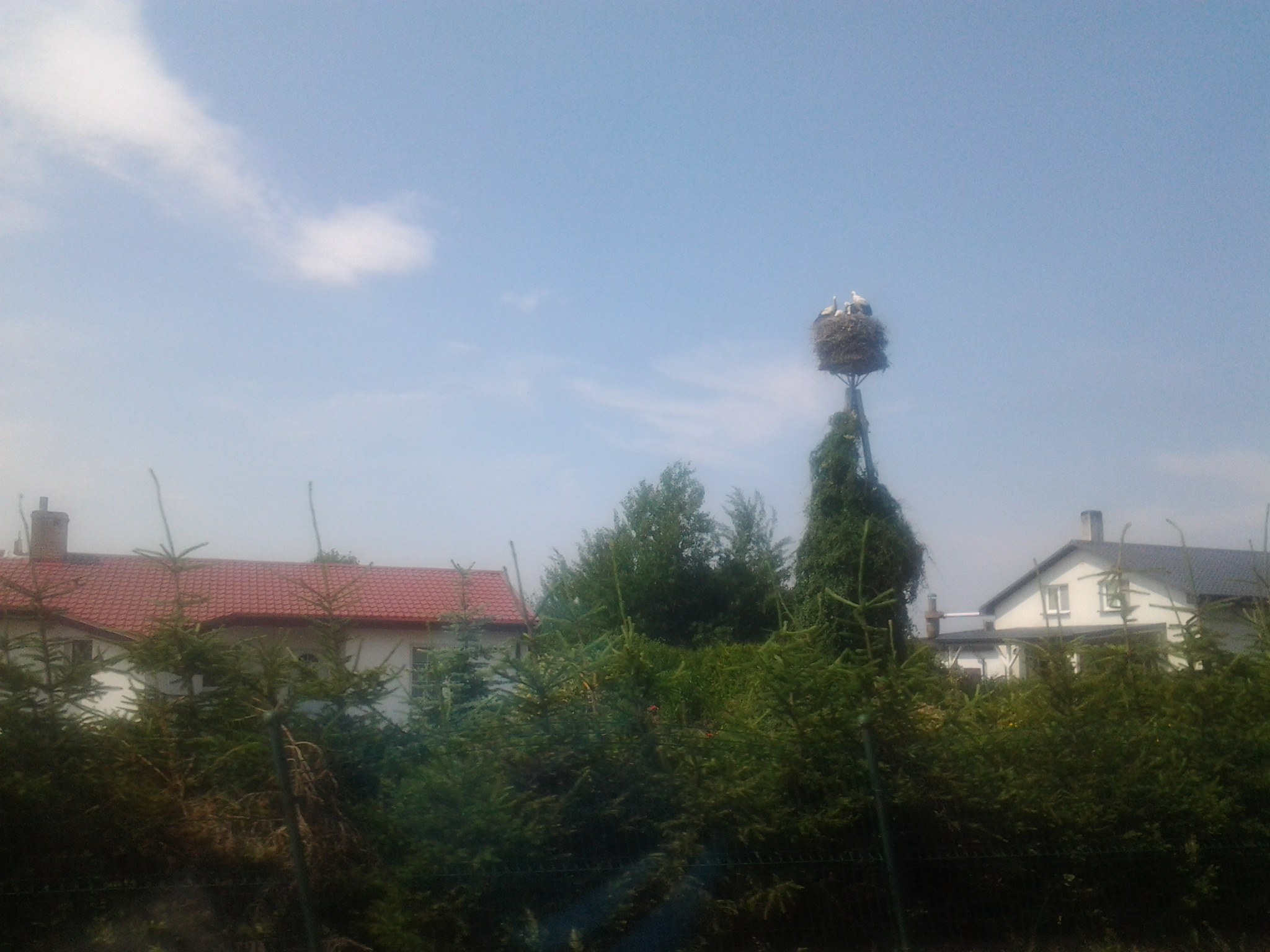
- Ciconia nest in Marcelin

- Location within Poland
- Coordinates: 53°43′03″N 16°44′38″E
- Country: Poland
- Voivodeship: West Pomeranian
- County: Szczecinek
- Gmina: Szczecinek

Marcelin [marˈt͡sɛlin] is a village in the administrative district of Gmina Szczecinek, within Szczecinek County, West Pomeranian Voivodeship, in north-western Poland.
