= Symbols of Szczecinek County =

The coat of arms of Szczecinek County.

The flag of Szczecinek County.

The coat of arms of Szczecinek County, West Pomeranian Voivodeship, Poland, depicts a red griffin holding a red shield with blue cross and six six-pointed stars on it, placed in a white escutcheon (shield). The flag consists of three vertical stripes, which are white, red, and white, with the middle red stripe being three times wider than the others. In its centre is placed the coat of arms. Both symbols were established on 4 November 1999.

== Design ==
The coat of arms of Szczecinek County consists of a white (silver) Iberian style escutcheon (shield) with a square top and rounded base. It depicts a red grffin with yellow (golden) claws and an open beak, with a red tongue sticking out of its mouth. The creature faces to the viewr's left, stands on its back feet, and has risen wings, and a tail curled down between its legs. It holds a red Iberian style escutcheon (shield) with both of its hands. The shield features a blue cross with six six-pointed stars on its bars, including two on both sides of its vertical bar, and one on each side of its horizontal bar, with an empty middle. The number of stars symbolizes six gminas (municipalities) of the county. The coat of arms was based on the seal used by Neustettin District, which was a subdivision located within the current boundaries of Szczecinek County from 1816 to 1945.

The flag of Szczecinek County is divided vertically into three stripes, which include a red stripe in the middle, and two white stripe, one on each side. The middle red stripe is three times bigger than the other two. In the centre of the flag is placed the coat of arms. The flag proportions have the aspect ratio of its height to its width equal to 5:8.

== History ==
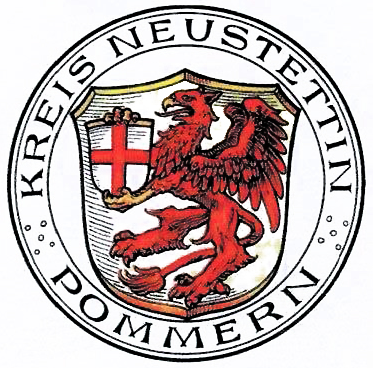
The seal of Neustettin District, which existed from 1816 to 1945.

Historically, within the current boundaries of Kamień County was located Neustettin District, which existed from 1816 to 1945. Its seal depicted a red grffin with yellow (golden) claws and beak. It faced to the viewr's left, stood on its back feet, and had risen wings. It held a white (silver) Iberian style escutcheon (shield) with a red cross on it. It was placed within a white (silver) escutcheon (shield), which was encircled by a white circle that featured two rows of text with black capitalised letters. The top text read Kreis Neustettin, which in translation from German, means Neustettin District or Szczecinek District. The bottom text read Pommern, which means Pomerania.

Szczecinek County was established on 1 January 1999. Its coat of arms and flag were adopted by the Szczecinek County Council, on 4 November 1999.
