= Świątki, Szczecinek =

Świątki
- part of the town
- Location within Poland
- Coordinates: 53°41′9″N 16°40′55″E
- Country: Poland
- Voivodeship: West Pomeranian
- County: Szczecinek
- Town: Szczecinek
- Population: 340

Świątki (Polish: [ˈɕfjɔntkʲi]; formerly German: Marientron) is a part of the town Szczecinek, in West Pomeranian Voivodeship, in north-western Poland. It lies approximately 142 km (88 mi) east of the regional capital Szczecin.
