= Trzesieka =

- Neighbourhood
- Location within Poland
- Coordinates: 53°43′N 16°38′E
- Country: Poland
- Voivodeship: West Pomeranian
- County: Szczecinek
- Gmina: Szczecinek

Trzesieka [tʂɛˈɕɛka] (German: Streitzig) is a neighbourhood of Szczecinek, within Szczecinek County, West Pomeranian Voivodeship, in north-western Poland.
