= Szczecinek Castle =

Castle of the Pomeranian Dukes
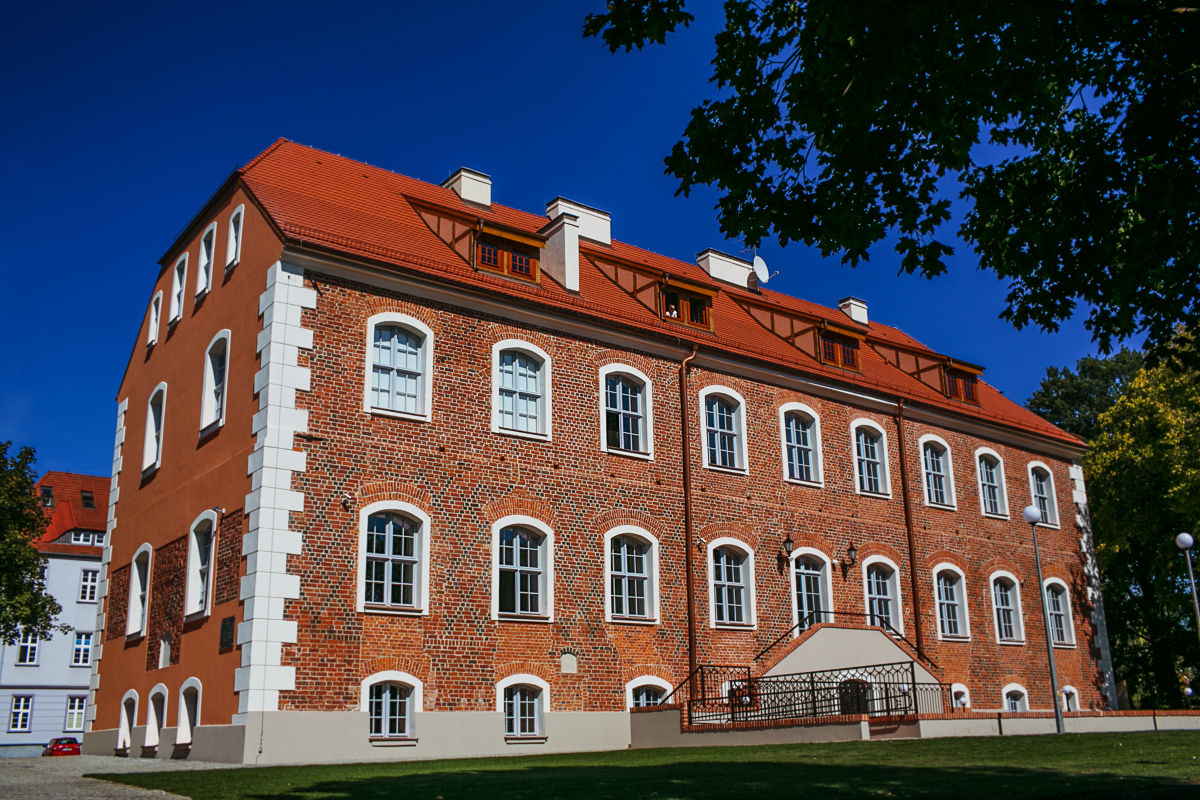
- Castle of the Pomeranian Dukes

- Location of the Castle of the Pomeranian Dukes in Poland
- 53°41′N 16°41′E
- Location: Szczecinek, West Pomeranian Voivodeship in Poland

History
- Built: 1310

Site notes
- Architectural style: Renaissance

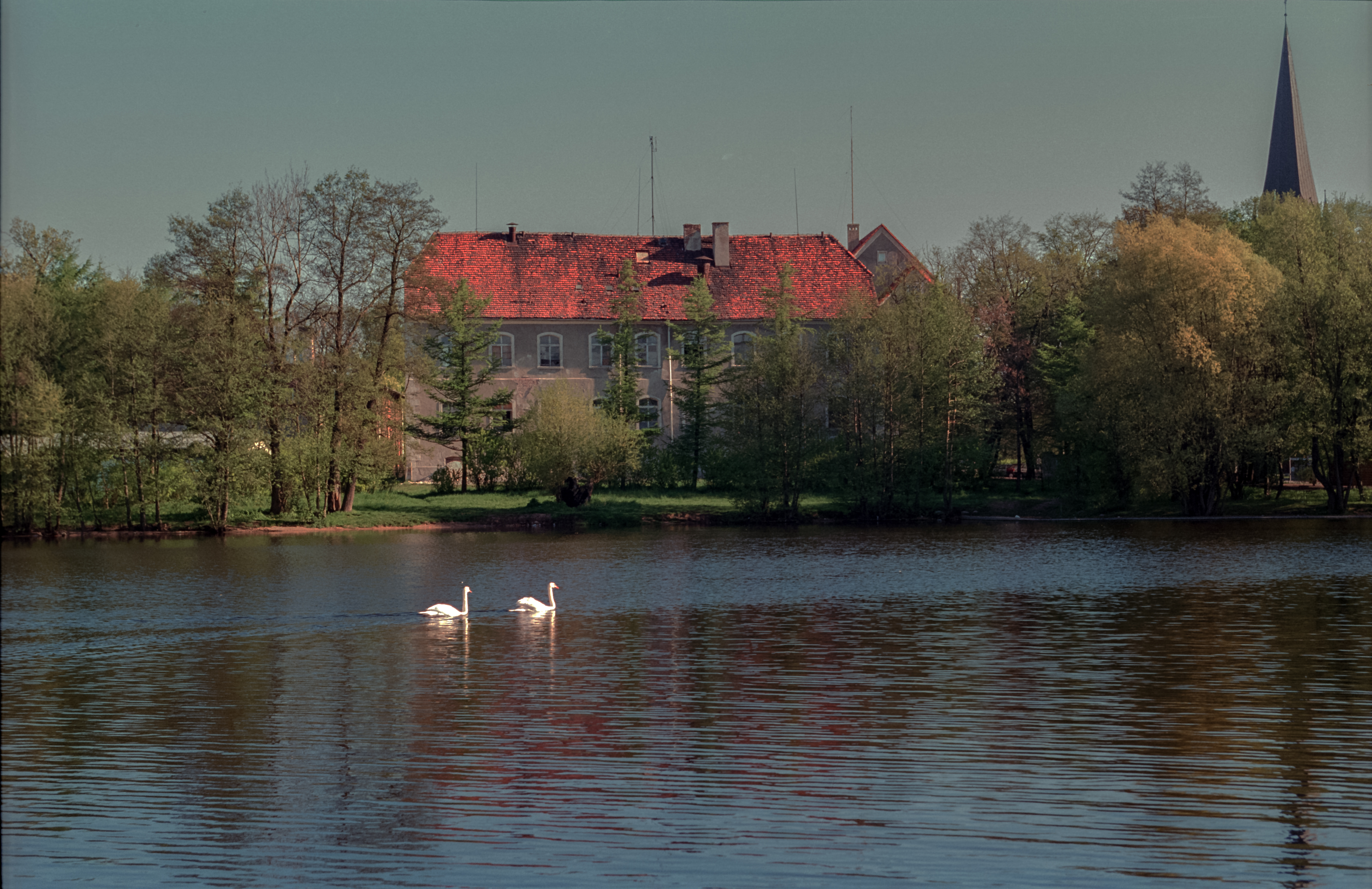
Castle of the Pomeranian Dukes

Castle of the Pomeranian Dukes - a medieval castle in the town of Szczecinek, for the Pomeranian Dukes. The southern wing of the castle was built in the early fourteenth century, in the location of a former Slavic gord. Due to reconstructions in the sixteenth, nineteenth and twentieth centuries the castle has not kept its original characteristics.

Formerly, the castle was located on an island in the Trzesiecko Lake, however after the lowering of the water (two land ameliorations had been made in the town in 1780 to 1784 and 1866 to 1868) the castle was located on a peninsula. In the footsteps of the castle is located the City Park which was founded between 1875 and 1903. After the Second World War the castle was used by the army, later used as a recreational ground. In 1996, the castle was sold, and is currently used as an office, access to the courtyard is unavailable.

In 2011, the castle had undergone a renovation, and its ceremony opening was September 14, 2013. The castle is the headquarters for the Castle Conference Centre (Centrum Konferencyjne ZAMEK), where there is space for 150 people, the castle also houses a gallery.
