= Artur Bugaj =

Polish footballer

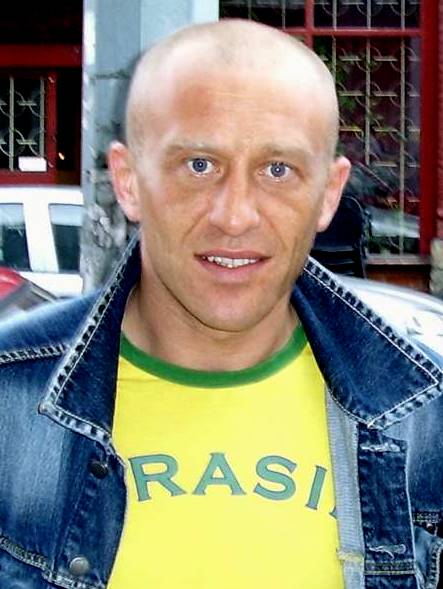
- Artur Bugaj

Personal information
- Date of birth: 22 October 1970 (age 56)
- Place of birth: Szczecinek, Poland
- Height: 1.76 m (5 ft 9 in)
- Position: Forward

Youth career
- –1988: Darzbór Szczecinek

Senior career*
Years	Team	Apps	(Gls)
1988–1991	Wisła Kraków	0	(0)
1989–1990	→ Cracovia (loan)		
1991	Darzbór Szczecinek		
1991–1992	Gwardia Koszalin		
1992–1994	Pogoń Szczecin	34	(2)
1994–1996	Amica Wronki		
1997	Dyskobolia Grodzisk		
1997–1998	Aluminium Konin		
1998	ŁKS Łódź	4	(1)
1998–1999	Aluminium Konin		
1999–2000	Pogoń Szczecin	22	(1)
2000–2001	GKS Bełchatów	17	(2)
2001–2002	Lech Poznań		
2003	Ceramika Opoczno	12	(2)
2003–2006	Pogoń Szczecin	54	(13)
2006	→ Śląsk Wrocław (loan)	13	(1)
2011	Victoria 95 Przecław		
- * Club domestic league appearances and goals

Artur Bugaj (born 22 October 1970) is a Polish former professional football player who played as a forward.

He initially was on the books at Wisła Kraków, but did not play a game there. He played in the second league for Cracovia in 1989/90. Having scored 40 goals by the 1995/96 season, he declined in form until 2000/01 when he spent two seasons in the second division, in GKS Bełchatów and Lech Poznań.

== Honours ==
Lech Poznań

- II liga: 2001–02

Pogoń Szczecin

- II liga: 2003–04
