= Ernst Henrici =

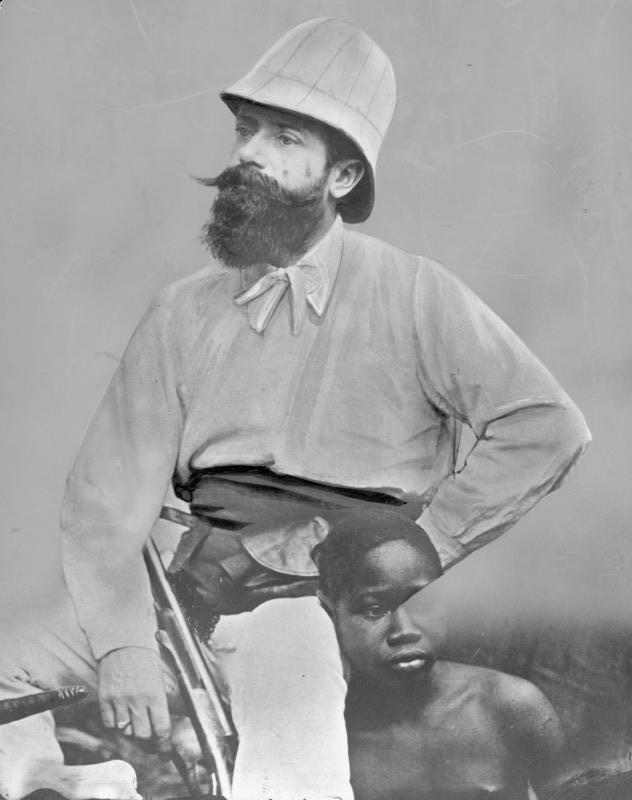
Henrici in 1880

Carl Ernst Julius Henrici (10 December 1854, Berlin – 10 July 1915, Döbeln) was a German grammar school teacher, writer, colonial adventurer and antisemitic politician.

== Life ==
Born to tax-collector Friedrich Wilhelm Ludwig Henrici and his wife Wilhelmine in Berlin, Henrici studied at the Friedrich-Werdersches Gymnasium and graduated in 1874. He then studied philology at the Frederick William University and took a doctorate in 1878 with an award-winning work on "Notkers Psalmenkommentar". He subsequently served as a teacher at a private high school for young ladies. Together with his older brother, Emil, a grammar school teacher, he founded the Society for German philology and published much work on linguistic and historical topics. In 1879, he travelled to study in London when his first marriage ended. After his return in the same year he underwent an internship as a grammar school teacher at the Luisenstraße Municipal Secondary School in Berlin and moved in the next year to Victoria school, another high school for young ladies.

== Antisemitic agitator ==
Politically active Henrici was initially involved in the liberal German Progress Party (Deutsche Fortschrittspartei); after 1880, however, he became a radical antisemitic agitator in the Berlin movement. He was co-initiator of the so-called Antisemitenpetition, founded the Social Reich Party (Soziale Reichspartei) in 1881 and propagated in numerous meetings (17 December 1880 "imperial hall speech", on 30 December 1880 "Bock assembly") a racist antisemitic, anti-capitalist, anti-liberal and anti-conservative agenda. On New Year's Eve 1880 there were anti-Jewish riots in Berlin, that were attributed to Henrici's inflammatory speeches. In 1881 he was therefore dismissed from the school. In 1882 he participated in the first International Anti-Jewish Congress in Dresden.

== Synagogue fire in Neustettin ==
A few days after an antisemitic diatribe in Neustettin (13 February 1881) the city's synagogue was burnt down. While the local Jews and the liberal press a suspected arson attack, the antisemites alleged that the Jews had set the synagogue alight to discredit antisemitism and to claim the building's insurance money for cash. Five members of the Jewish community were prosecuted for arson and sent to prison, but acquitted in the second instance. In connection with these agitations anti-Jewish riots occurred in Neustettin and other such as places Farther Pomerania and West Prussia.

== Election defeat and end of his political career ==
Within the Berlin movement, Henrici the ultra-radical remained an outsider. Henrici did not participate in the alliance of conservatives and antisemites in Conservativen Central Committee, but stood in the Reichstag elections as an Independent. With only 843 votes he suffered a devastating defeat against Max Liebermann von Sonnenberg. Until 1885 he still operated in radical antisemitic circles until he turned to the colonial movement. In 1884 he married a second time to Clara Agnes Luise Lehmann who bore him three children: Elsa Hedwig Luise, Walther Ludwig Adalbert and Lothar.

== Colonial adventurer ==
After participating in a government expedition to Togo in West Africa, (a recent Imperial German colony) in 1887, in 1888 he was co-founder and Chairman of the Nightingale Society for patriotic Africa Research and lectured about German cultural work in Africa. With his brother-in-law, the landscape painter Franz Leuschner, he travelled a second time to Togo in order to buy farmland. His attempt to gain as foothold as a planter in the then German colony in West Africa failed through inadequate agricultural and geographical knowledge. In 1890 he founded the German Togoland company, "Henrici and partners" which in the same year had to be dissolved. In 1891 he returned completely impoverished and heavily in debt to Germany, from where he embarked overseas. In the New World in 1891, he was made surveyor at the German-built railway in Venezuela in South America and later as a bridge-builder and coffee planter in Costa Rica in Central America. In 1902, he took over a job as a mechanical engineer in Baltimore, in Maryland in the United States at the well-known foundry and metal-working company, Hayward, Bartlett, and Co. Here he published his Dramatic Works. In 1905 Henrici returned to Germany and was married for the third time, to Edith Meyer. From 1907, he worked in Leipzig as editor of the Spanish- and English-language magazines El Comprador and Energy. In 1908, he travelled again to the United States, held lectures in New York City and then briefly operated a farm in America near Mechanicsville in Maryland. After his third wife was killed by a lightning strike, he married Paula Riedel in 1909 and sold his farm the following year. In 1910 Henrici attempted in vain the habilitation at the University of Leipzig in the areas of colonial economy and transport. In 1911 he led an agricultural-technical office and laboratory in Klinga and in 1912 and tried to run as a prospective candidate in the Reichstag elections for the Saxon conservatives. In Klinga he led from 1913 the State school home and was editor of the Evangelical national antisemitic journal Frankfurt Viewpoint. An article in which he sharply criticized a speech by Rosa Luxemburg led to a court conviction. In 1914 he also acted as a research assistant at the Leipzig Book Fair for Trade, and in September 1914 became relief teacher at the Royal Grammar School with Real Higher Agricultural School in Döbeln. He died in 1915 in Döbeln at the age of 60.

== Awards and honors ==
- 1880 First Prize Foundation of Charlotte by the Royal Prussian Academy of Sciences (for a study on the works of Martin Luther)
- 1903 prize at the Cologne Flower Games (for the poem "The Fullahmaid")

== Works ==
- The Sources of Psalms Notkers, dissertation, Strasbourg 1878
- "What Is the Core Issue of the Jews?", lecture, Berlin 1881
- "Tolerance and national honor", speech, Berlin 1881
- Boetius, Tragedy in Five Acts, Berlin 1882
- The Neustettiner Synagogue Fire in court, Berlin 1883
- The German territory of Togo and my journey Africa, Leipzig 1887
- Textbook of Ephe language (Ewe)
- Dramatic Works, Baltimore 1904
- Kolonial-economial Tasks of the German Businessman, Leipzig 1908

== Literature ==
- Gerd Hoffmann: Der Prozeß um den Brand der Synagoge in Neustettin. Antisemitismus in Deutschland ausgangs des 19. Jahrhunderts. With an introductory biography and comments on biobibliographics Ernst Henrici, Hermann Makower, Erich Sello. 1998
