= Siedlice, Szczecinek County =

Siedlice
- Settlement
- Location within Poland
- Coordinates: 53°38′41″N 16°48′40″E
- Country: Poland
- Voivodeship: West Pomeranian
- County: Szczecinek
- Gmina: Szczecinek

Siedlice [ɕɛˈdlit͡sɛ] is a settlement in the administrative district of Gmina Szczecinek, within Szczecinek County, West Pomeranian Voivodeship, in north-western Poland.

== See also ==
- History of Pomerania
