= Szczecinek =

City in West Pomeranian Voivodeship, Poland

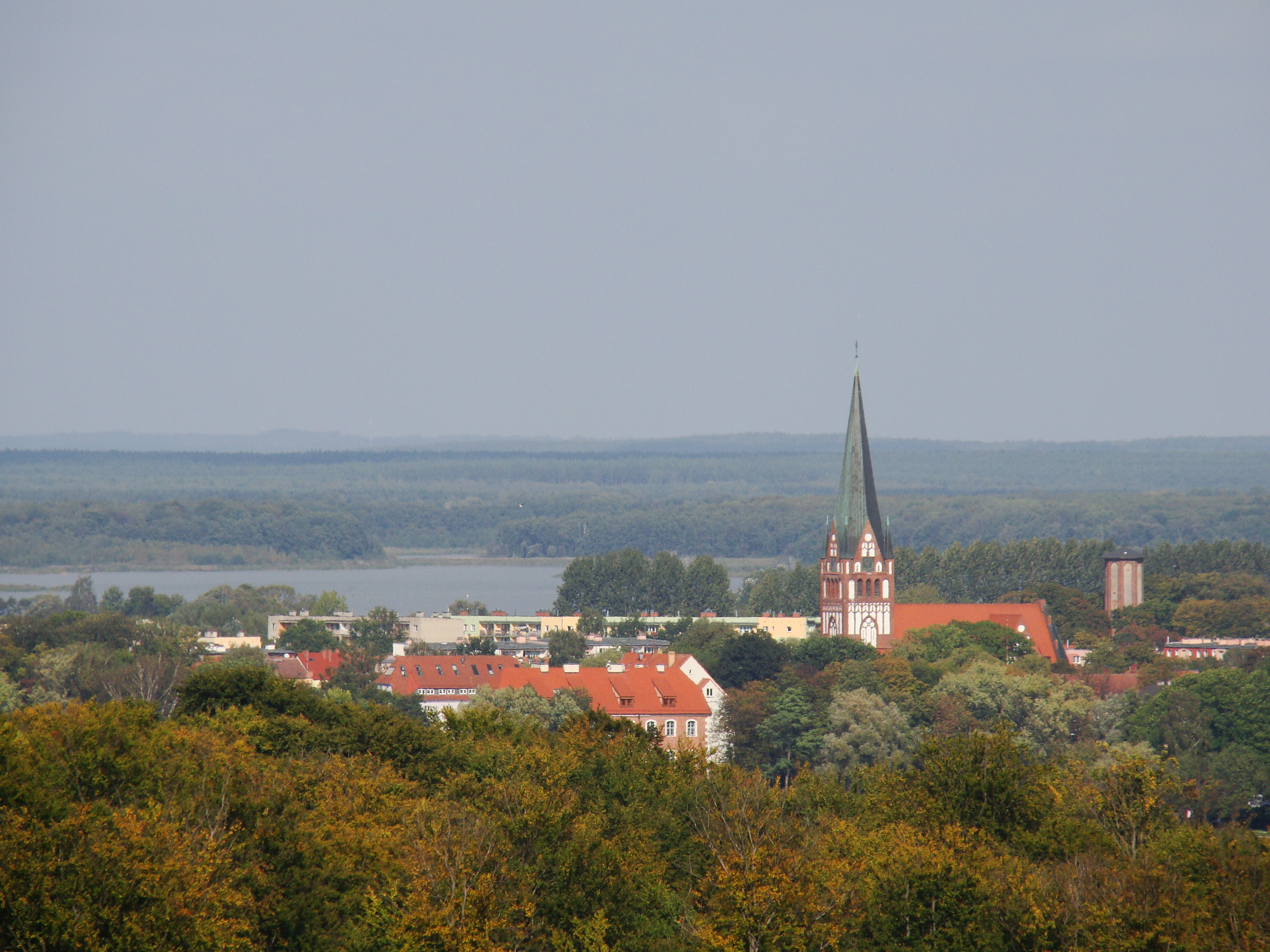
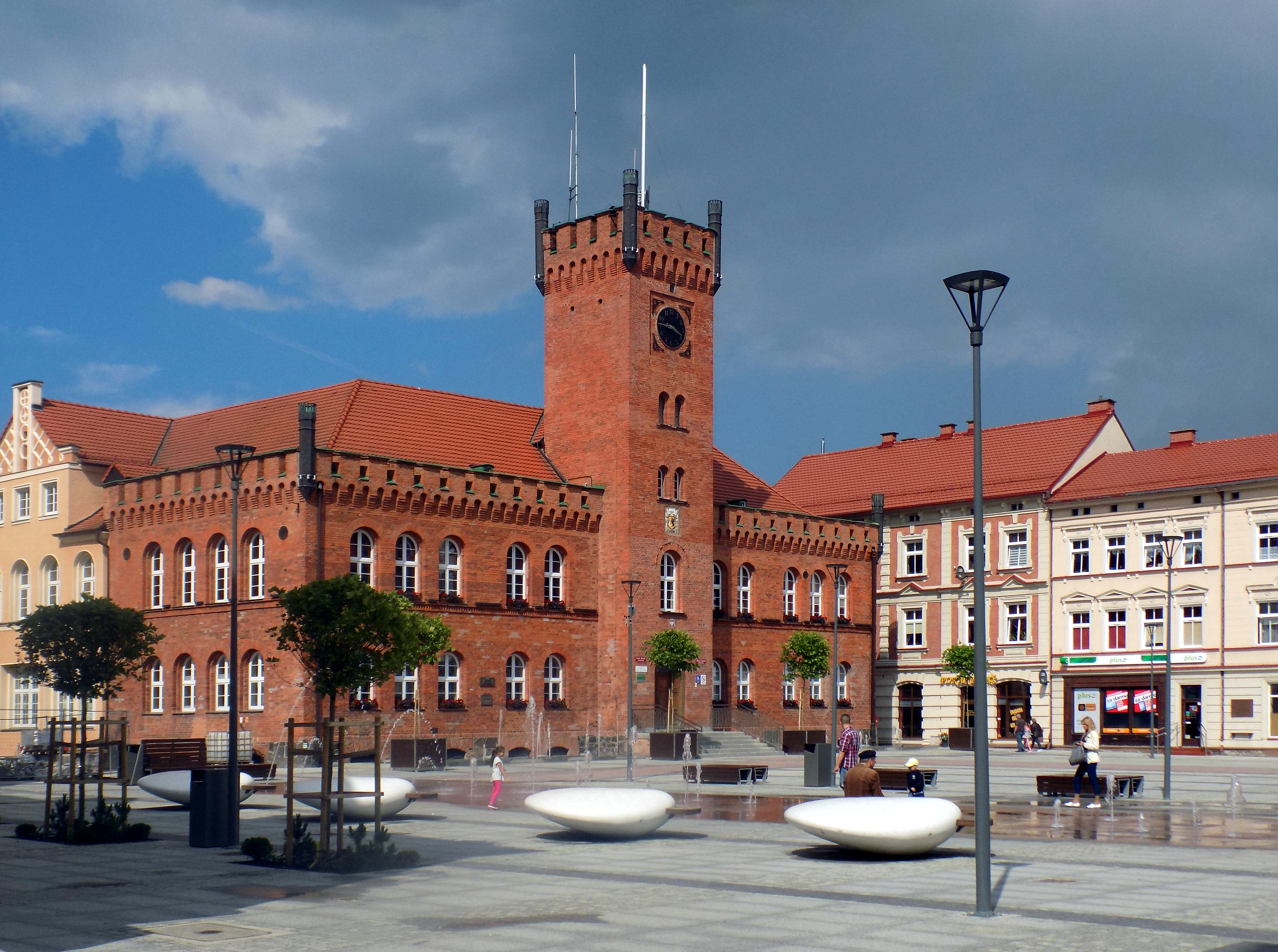
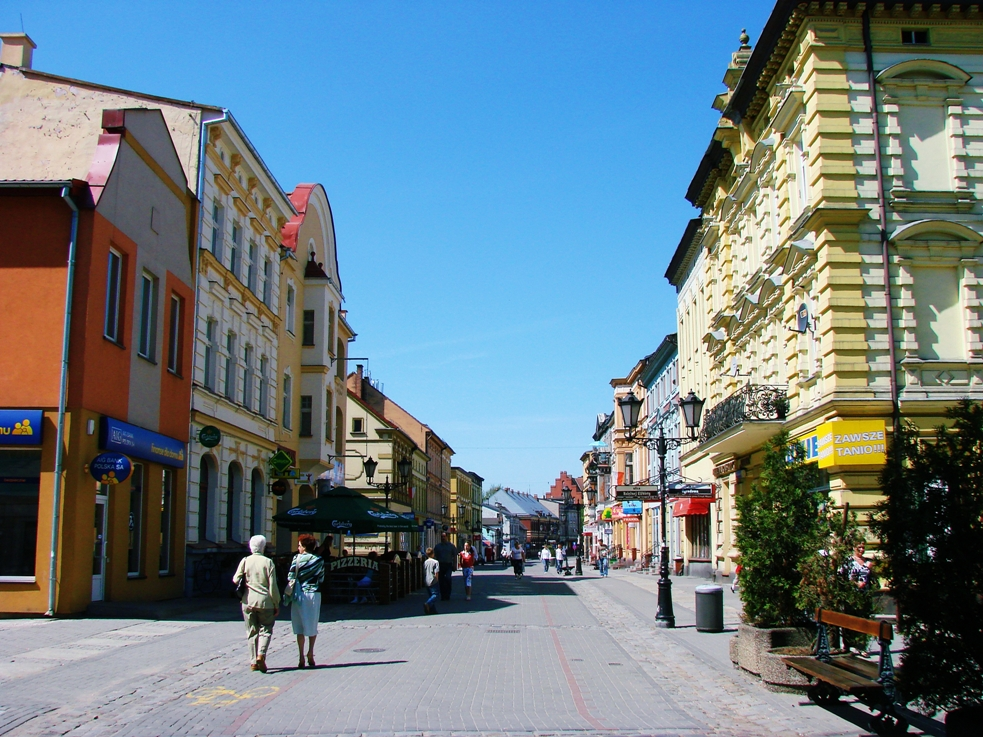
- Panorama of Szczecinek Town Hall and Market Square Bohaterów Warszawy - promenade dedicated to the war heroes of Warsaw

- Flag Coat of arms

- Location within Poland
- Coordinates: 53°43′N 16°41′E
- Country: Poland
- Voivodeship: West Pomeranian
- County: Szczecinek
- Gmina: Szczecinek (urban gmina)
- Established: 1310
- City rights: 1310

Government
  - Mayor: Jerzy Hardie-Douglas

Area
  - Total: 48.63 km^{2} (18.78 sq mi)

Population (2010)
  - Total: 40,211
  - Density: 826.9/km^{2} (2,142/sq mi)
- Time zone: UTC+1 (CET)
  - Summer (DST): UTC+2 (CEST)
- Postal codes: 78-400, 78-401, 78-402, 78-403, 78-404, 78-410
- Area code: +48 94
- Car plates: ZSZ
- Website: http://www.szczecinek.pl

Szczecinek (Polish: [ʂt͡ʂɛˈt͡ɕinɛk]; German: Neustettin) is a historic city in Middle Pomerania, northwestern Poland, capital of Szczecinek County in the West Pomeranian Voivodeship, with a population of more than 40,000 (2011). The town's total area is 48.63 square kilometres (18.78 square miles).

The turbulent history of Szczecinek reaches back to the High Middle Ages, when the area was ruled by Pomeranian dukes and princes. The majority of the city's architecture survived World War II and, subsequently, its entire Old Town was proclaimed a national heritage monument of Poland. Szczecinek is the location of one of the oldest museums and one of the oldest high schools in Pomerania and northern Poland, and one of the places of production of krówki. It is an important railroad junction, located along the main Poznań - Kołobrzeg line, which crosses less important lines to Chojnice and Słupsk.

== Location ==
Szczecinek lies in eastern part of West Pomeranian Voivodeship. Historically, it was included within Western Pomerania. In 2010, the city boundaries were expanded as the town merged with the following villages in Gmina Szczecinek: Gałowo, Marcelin, Godzimierz, Turowo, Parsęcko, Buczek and Żółtnica.

== History and etymology ==
=== Middle Ages ===
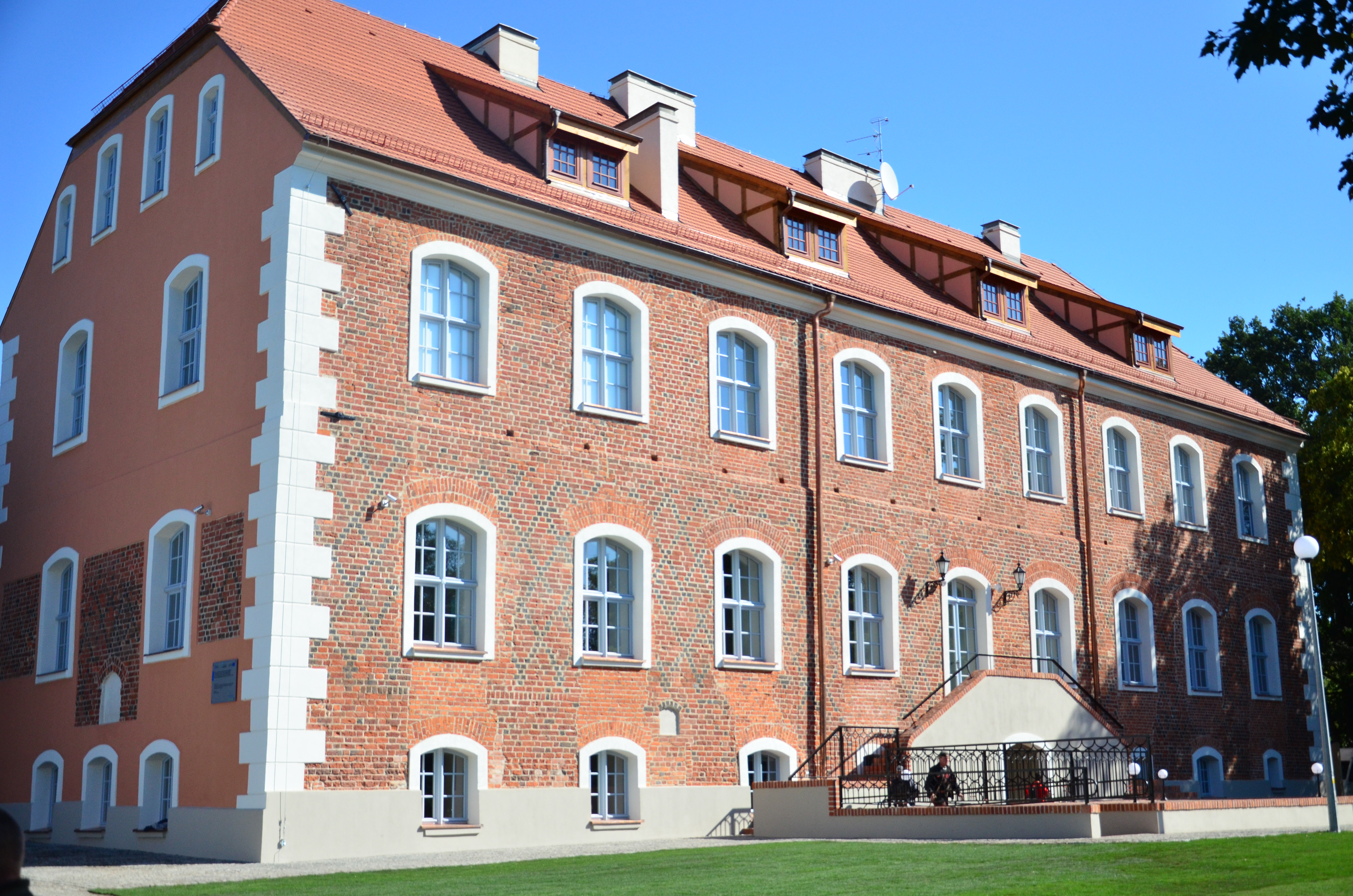
Szczecinek Castle, former seat of local Pomeranian Dukes

In the Middle Ages a Slavic stronghold existed in present-day Szczecinek. It was part of the early Polish state in the 10th century, and as a result of the 12th-century fragmentation of Poland, it became part of the separate Duchy of Pomerania.

In 1310, the castle at the site of a former stronghold, and town were founded under Lübeck law by Duke Wartislaw IV of Pomerania and modelled after Szczecin (German: Stettin) which is situated about 150 kilometres (93 miles) to the west. The initial name was "Neustettin" (Polish: Nowy Szczecin, German: Neustettin, Latin: Stetin Nova). It was also known as "Klein Stettin" (Polish: Mały Szczecin, German: Klein Stettin). In 1707 the town was known in Polish as Nowoszczecin, while the Mały Szczecin name gradually developed into the modern name Szczecinek.

The town was fortified to face the Brandenburgers, with a wall and palisades. In 1356 it was hit by the plague. Thankful for their survival, the Dukes Bogislaw V, Barnim IV and Wartislaw V founded the Augustine monastery Marientron, on the Marientron hill on the southern bank of the Trzesiecko Lake. It was plundered by Brandenburgers in 1470. From 1368 to 1390 it was the seat of an eponymous duchy under its only historic ruler Wartislaw V. Afterwards, it was ruled by Pomeranian duchies: Darłowo (Rügenwalde) (until 1418), Słupsk (until 1474, fief of Poland) and the united Duchy of Pomerania (until 1618).

On 15 September 1423, the "great day of Neustettin", the Pomeranian dukes, the Grand Master of the Teutonic Order and Nordic king Eric VII of Denmark, Norway and Sweden met to discuss defense against the union of Brandenburg and Poland. During the Thirteen Years' War, local dukes changed alliances several times. As a result, in 1455 several surrounding villages were looted by Teutonic Knights and in 1461 the town was sacked, looted and burned by Polish troops and Tatars because King Casimir IV Jagiellon wanted to take revenge on Eric II of Pomerania who supported the Teutonic Knights.

=== Modern period ===
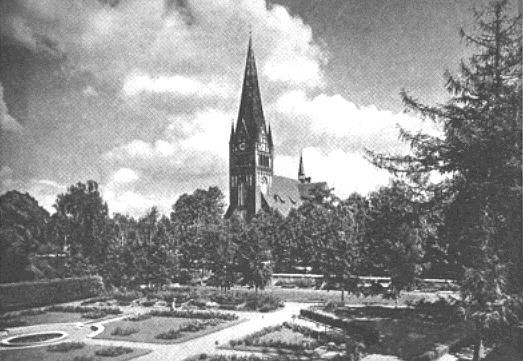
Early 20th-century view of the St. Mary church

In 1601 a Polish school was established, and in 1640 a gymnasium was founded, which as today's I Liceum Ogólnokształcące is one of the oldest high schools in Pomerania. During the Thirty Years' War it was captured and plundered by the Swedes and Austrians. After the war, from 1653, the town was part of Brandenburg, from 1701 of Prussia and from 1871 to 1945 of Germany. During the Seven Years' War, in 1759 it was plundered by the Russians. In 1807, during the Napoleonic Wars and Polish national liberation fights, the town was captured by Poles led by Tomasz Łubieński.

In 1881 Abraham Springer, great-grandfather of TV presenter Jerry Springer and a prominent member of the town's Jewish community launched an unsuccessful attempt to sue agitator Dr Ernst Henrici, claiming that an inflammatory anti-semitic speech in the town led directly to the burning down of the synagogue on 18 February of that year.

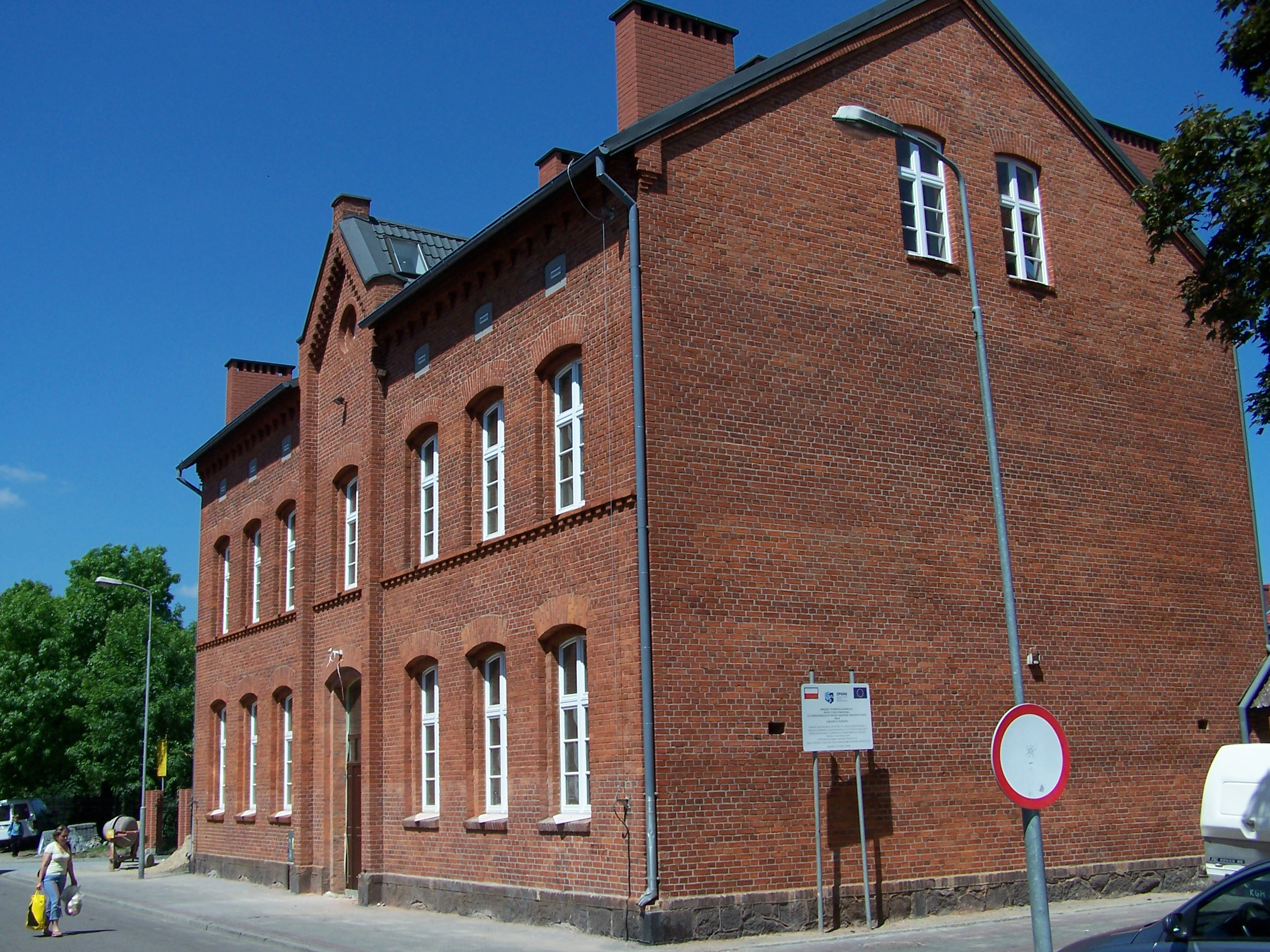
Regional Museum in Szczecinek

In 1914 the Regional Museum was established. In 1923 the Catholic Church of the Holy Spirit was built, then called the "Polish Church", as it was co-financed by local Poles.

After the Nazis took power in Germany in the 1930s, new military barracks were built, and the invasion of Poland was carried out from the town at the beginning of World War II in 1939. During the war, five forced labour camps were established and operated by the Germans in the town, with prisoners of three camps being mostly Poles and Russians, and prisoners of two subcamps of the Stalag II-B prisoner-of-war camp being mostly French. In September 1944, the Germans made the first arrests of local members of the Polish underground organization "Odra", ultimately crushing it in the following weeks. In February 1945, the town was captured by the Red Army, and the local agricultural machinery factory, which used forced labour during the war, was plundered by occupying Russian forces. The town then passed to Poland, although with a Soviet-installed communist regime, which remained in power until the Fall of Communism in the 1980s. The town's German population was expelled, and it was repopulated with Poles, expellees from former eastern Poland annexed by the Soviet Union and settlers from central Poland. The plundered agricultural machinery factory was relaunched by Poles in July 1945. The Polish anti-communist resistance ("cursed soldiers") was active in the town, and many of its members were arrested and sentenced to prison by the communists. The last "cursed soldier" of Szczecinek, Maria Sosnowska, died in 2018.

From 1950 to 1998, it was administratively located in the Koszalin Voivodeship.

In 2009 the town limits were expanded by including the neighbouring villages of Świątki and Trzesieka as new districts.

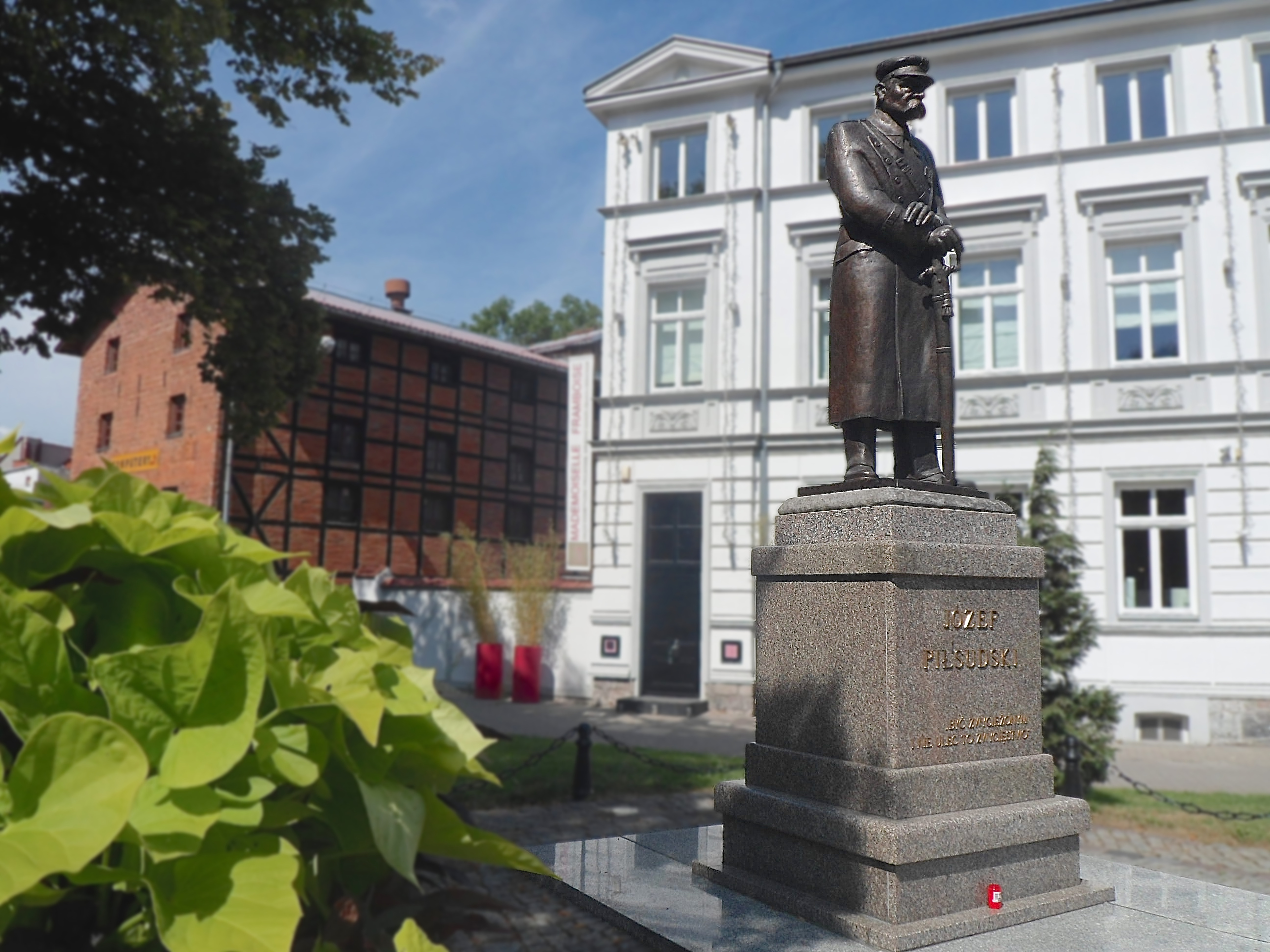
Józef Piłsudski monument by local sculptor Wiesław Adamski

In 2018, a khachkar was unveiled in Szczecinek to commemorate Armenian-Polish friendship.

== Education ==
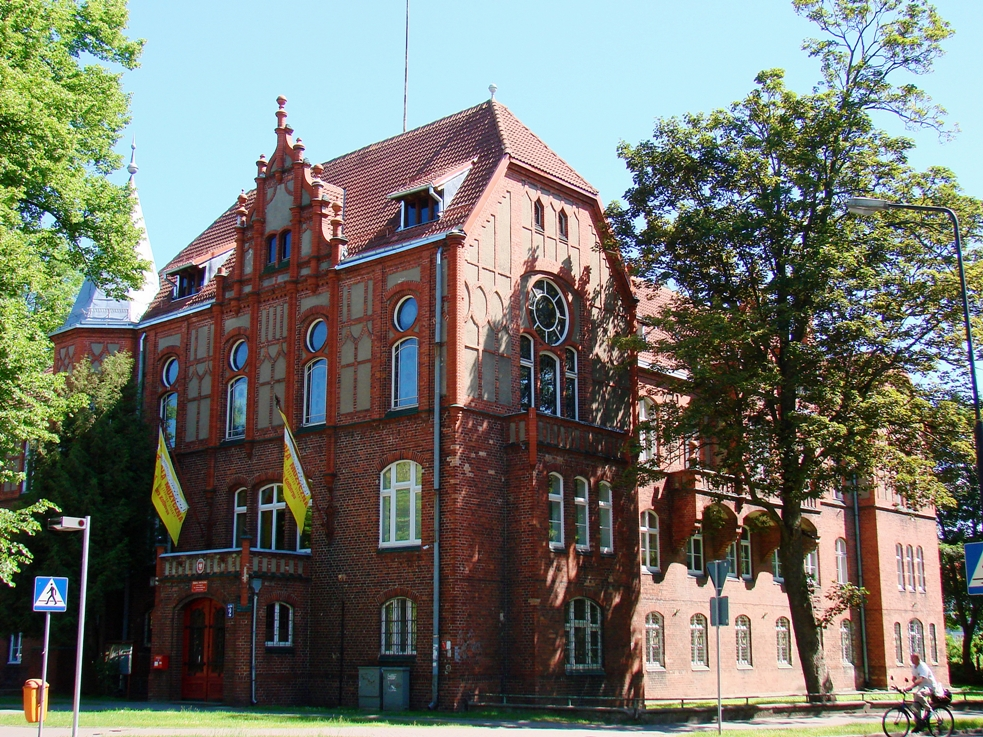
Music school

- Duchess Elizabeth Secondary School
- Vocational School of Economics in Szczecinek
- Vocational Technical School in Szczecinek
- Vocational School of Agriculture in Świątki
- Private Secondary School
- Social Secondary School
- Społeczna Wyższa Szkoła Przedsiębiorczości i Zarządzania in Łódź, branch in Szczecinek
- Koszalin University of Technology, branch in Szczecinek

== Major corporations ==
- Grupa Kronospan Szczecinek
- KPPD Szczecinek SA
- Schneider Electric Poland

== Historical population ==
Historical population

Year	Pop.	±%
1900	10,024	—
1910	11,833	+18.0%
1925	15,487	+30.9%
1939	19,942	+28.8%
1946	12,413	−37.8%

Year	Pop.	±%
1950	15,097	+21.6%
1960	22,803	+51.0%
1970	28,700	+25.9%
1975	32,900	+14.6%
1980	35,700	+8.5%

Year	Pop.	±%
1990	41,400	+16.0%
1995	42,300	+2.2%
2000	38,928	−8.0%
2010	38,977	+0.1%
2017	40,292	+3.4%

== Cuisine ==
The officially protected traditional food of Szczecinek (as designated by the Ministry of Agriculture and Rural Development of Poland) is krówka szczecinecka, a local type of krówka (traditional Polish candy).

== Notable residents ==
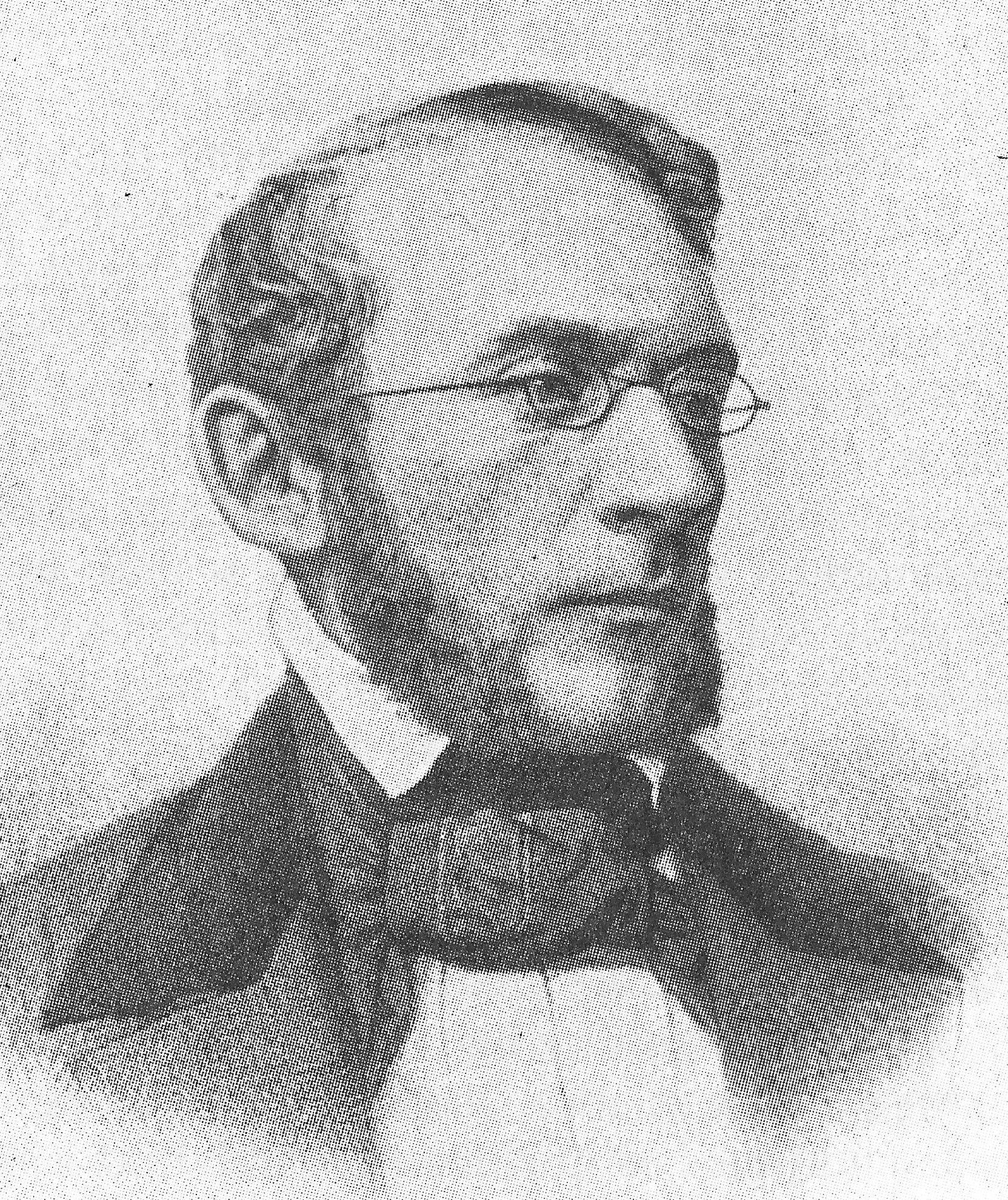
Lothar Bücher

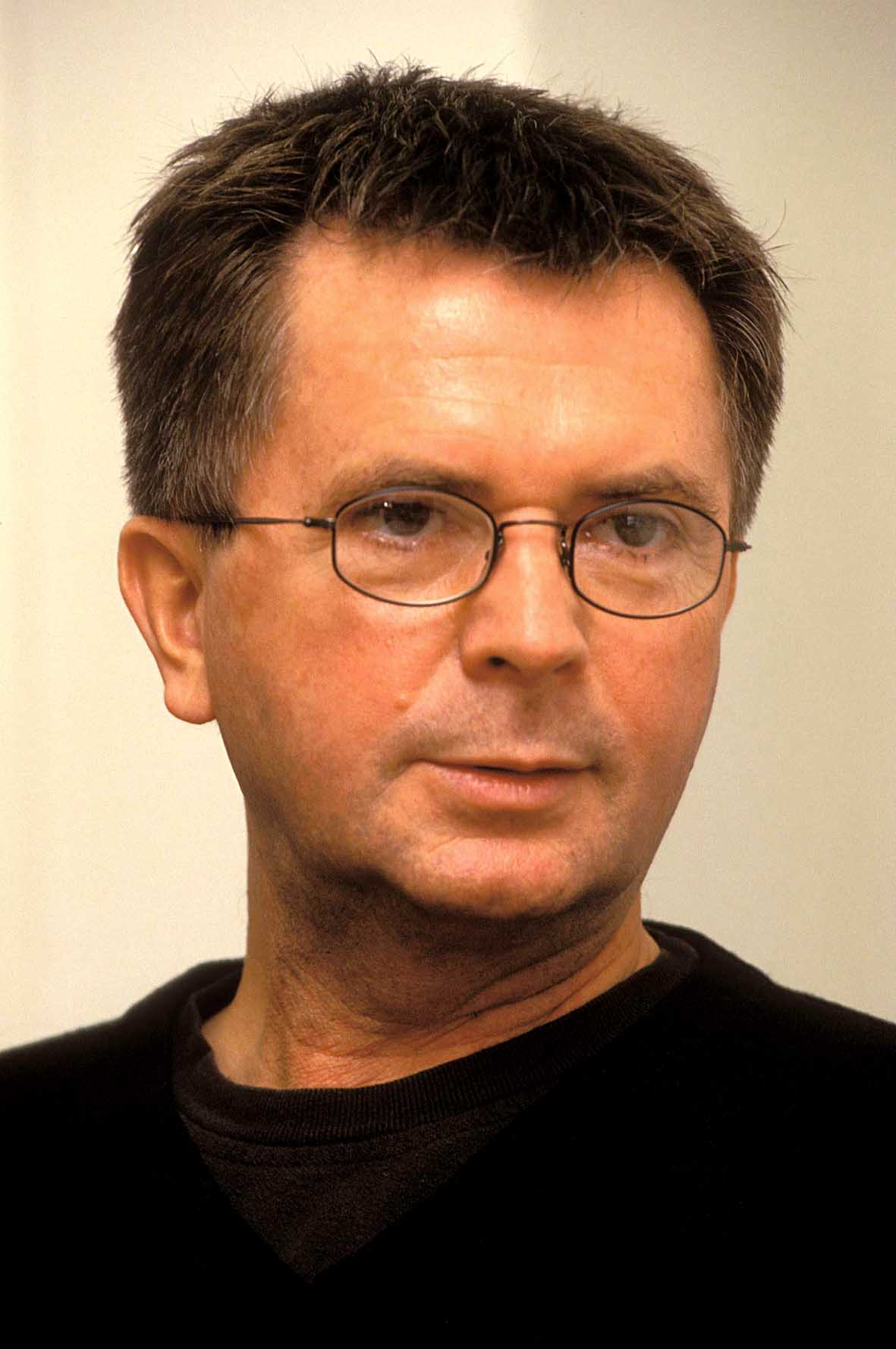
Aleksander Wolszczan

- Caspar Otto von Glasenapp (1664 at Gut Wurchow – 1747), Prussian Generalfeldmarschall
- Franz Albert Schultz (1692–1763), Prussian divine and ecclesiastical superintendent
- Friedrich Jacob Behrend (1803–1889), German physician, published works on venereal disease, public hygiene and prostitution
- General Friedrich Kasiski (1805–1881), German infantry officer, cryptographer and archeologist
- Lothar Bucher (1817–1892), German publicist and trusted aide of Otto von Bismarck
- Gustav Behrend (1847–1925), German dermatologist
- Hans Krüger (1902–1971), politician, stepped down from his role amid controversy about his WWII background
- Eckart Afheldt (1921–1999), general
- Horst Mann (1927–2018), German sprinter, competed at the 1956 Summer Olympics
- Aleksander Wolszczan (born 1946), Polish astronomer, co-discovered the first extrasolar planets and pulsar planets
- Wiesław Adamski (1947–2017), Polish sculptor
- Jolanta Danielak (born 1955), Polish politician, served in the national Senate from 1997 to 2005
- Jarosław Boberek (born 1963), Polish film actor and voice actor
- Ewa Minge (born 1967), Polish fashion designer
- Dorota Dziekiewicz-Pilich (born 1969), Polish sculptor and drawing artist
- Artur Bugaj (born 1970), footballer
- Paweł Małaszyński (born 1975), Polish actor
- Aleksandra Gintrowska (born 1991), Polish singer and actress
- Jakub Moder (born 1999), Polish footballer

== International relations ==
Szczecinek is twinned with:

Bergen op Zoom, Netherlands; Noyelles-sous-Lens, France	Neustrelitz, Germany; Söderhamn, Sweden
