= Hviezdoslav =

Hviezdoslav is a Slovak name, meaning star celebrator.

- Pavol Országh Hviezdoslav
  - Hviezdoslavovo námestie ("Hviezdoslav Square")
    - in Bratislava, see Hviezdoslavovo námestie (Bratislava)
    - in Námestovo, see Hviezdoslavovo námestie (Námestovo)
    - in Nové Zámky, see Hviezdoslavovo námestie (Nové Zámky)
  - 3980 Hviezdoslav (1983 XU), a main-belt asteroid discovered in 1983 by Mrkos

== See also ==
- Hviezdoslavova
- Hvězda (disambiguation) (Czech word)
  - Hvězdonice
  - Hvězdoňovice
  - Hvězdlice
- Gwiazdy
- Gwiazdowo (disambiguation) (Polish toponym)
- Gwiazdowski (disambiguation)
