= Jadwigowo =

Jadwigowo may refer to the following places in Poland:

- Jadwigowo, Kuyavian-Pomeranian Voivodeship
- Jadwigowo, West Pomeranian Voivodeship
