= Bierzkowo =

- Settlement
- Location within Poland
- Coordinates: 53°40′18″N 16°21′24″E
- Country: Poland
- Voivodeship: West Pomeranian
- County: Szczecinek
- Gmina: Barwice

Bierzkowo [bʲɛʂˈkɔvɔ] was a settlement in the administrative district of Gmina Barwice, within Szczecinek County, West Pomeranian Voivodeship, in north-western Poland. It lies approximately 7 km (4 mi) south of Barwice, 23 km (14 mi) west of Szczecinek, and 121 km (75 mi) east of the regional capital Szczecin.
