= Kaźmierzewo =

Kaźmierzewo may refer to the following places:

- Kaźmierzewo, Nakło County in Kuyavian-Pomeranian Voivodeship (north-central Poland)
- Kaźmierzewo, Włocławek County in Kuyavian-Pomeranian Voivodeship (north-central Poland)
- Kaźmierzewo, West Pomeranian Voivodeship (north-west Poland)
