= Przybkowo =

Przybkowo may refer to the following places in West Pomeranian Voivodeship, Poland:

- Kolonia Przybkowo
- Przybkowo, Szczecinek County
- Przybkowo, Wałcz County
