= Sulikowo =

Sulikowo may refer to the following places in West Pomeranian Voivodeship, Poland:

- Kolonia Sulikowo
- Sulikowo, Kamień County
- Sulikowo, Szczecinek County
