= Grabiąż =

Grabiąż may refer to the following places in West Pomeranian Voivodeship, Poland:

- Nowy Grabiąż
- Stary Grabiąż
