= Cybulino =

Cybulino may refer to the following places in West Pomeranian Voivodeship, Poland:

- Cybulino, Koszalin County
- Cybulino, Szczecinek County
