= Ostrowąsy, West Pomeranian Voivodeship =

Ostrowąsy
- Village
- Location within Poland
- Coordinates: 53°47′N 16°22′E
- Country: Poland
- Voivodeship: West Pomeranian
- County: Szczecinek
- Gmina: Barwice

Ostrowąsy [ɔstrɔˈvɔ̃sɨ] (German: Wusterhanse) is a village in the administrative district of Gmina Barwice, within Szczecinek County, West Pomeranian Voivodeship, in north-western Poland. It lies approximately 6 km (4 mi) north of Barwice, 23 km (14 mi) west of Szczecinek, and 125 km (78 mi) east of the regional capital Szczecin.

For the history of the region, see History of Pomerania.
