= Orlinek =

Orlinek may refer to the following places in Poland:

- Orlinek, Kuyavian-Pomeranian Voivodeship
- Orlinek, Podlaskie Voivodeship
- Orlinek (ski jumping hill)
