= Chłopówko, Szczecinek County =

Chłopówko
- Settlement
- Location within Poland
- Coordinates: 53°41′13″N 16°15′17″E
- Country: Poland
- Voivodeship: West Pomeranian
- County: Szczecinek
- Gmina: Barwice

Chłopówko [xwɔˈpufkɔ] (German: Klein Klöpperfier) is a settlement in the administrative district of Gmina Barwice, within Szczecinek County, West Pomeranian Voivodeship, in north-western Poland. It lies approximately 9 km (6 mi) south-west of Barwice, 29 km (18 mi) west of Szczecinek, and 115 km (71 mi) east of the regional capital Szczecin.
