= Żdżar, Szczecinek County =

Żdżar
- Village
- Location within Poland
- Coordinates: 53°43′3″N 16°22′28″E
- Country: Poland
- Voivodeship: West Pomeranian
- County: Szczecinek
- Gmina: Barwice

Żdżar [ʐd͡ʐar] is a village in the administrative district of Gmina Barwice, within Szczecinek County, West Pomeranian Voivodeship, in north-western Poland. It lies approximately 3 km (2 mi) south-east of Barwice, 21 km (13 mi) west of Szczecinek, and 124 km (77 mi) east of the regional capital Szczecin.

For the history of the region, see History of Pomerania.
