= Piaski, Szczecinek County =

Piaski
- Village
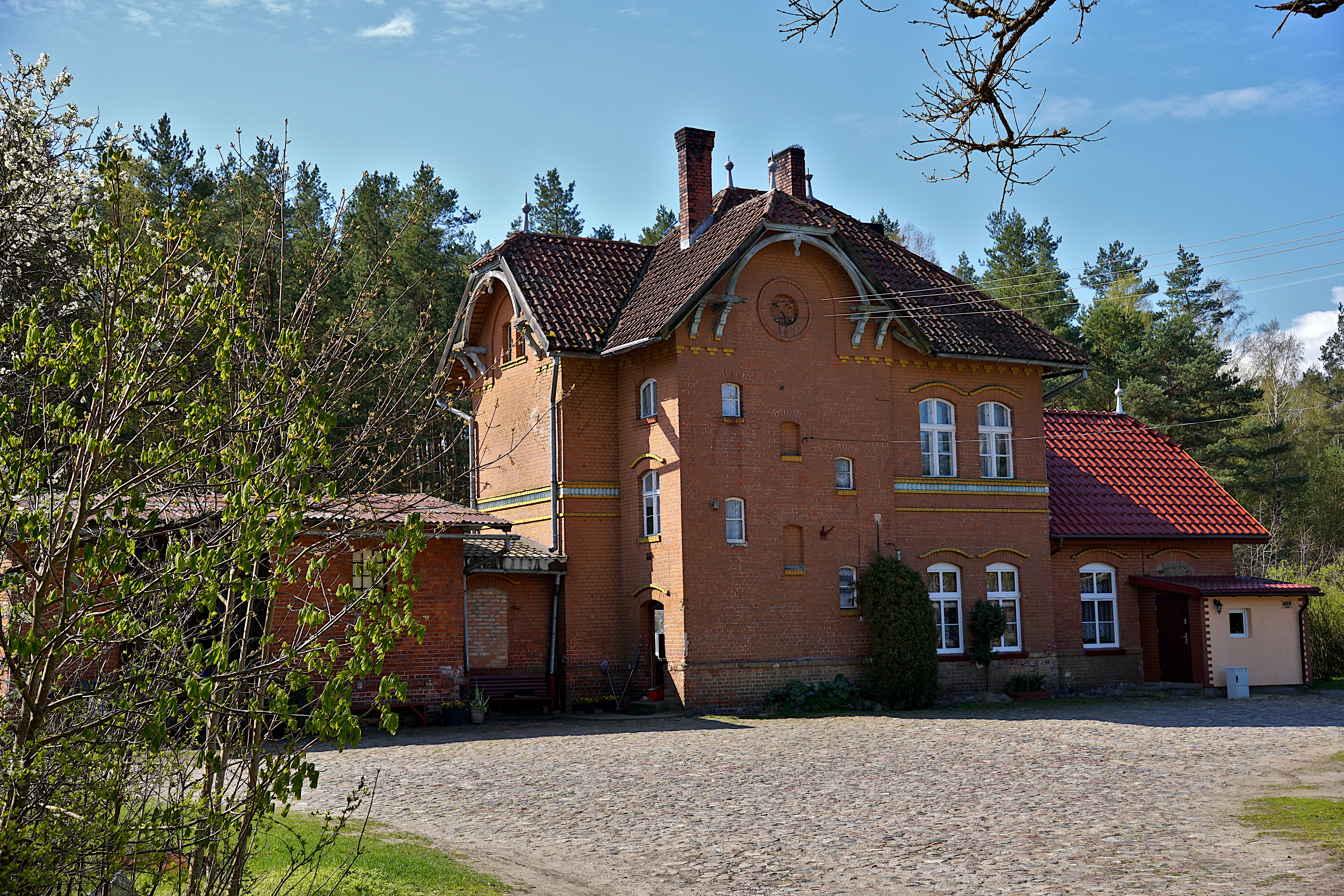
- Piaski train station

- Location within Poland
- Coordinates: 53°45′N 16°15′E
- Country: Poland
- Voivodeship: West Pomeranian
- County: Szczecinek
- Gmina: Barwice
- Time zone: UTC+1 (CET)
  - Summer (DST): UTC+2 (CEST)
- Postal code: 78-460
- Vehicle registration: ZSZ

Piaski (Polish pronunciation: [ˈpjaskʲi]; German: Patzig) is a village in the administrative district of Gmina Barwice, within Szczecinek County, West Pomeranian Voivodeship, in north-western Poland. It lies approximately 7 km (4 mi) west of Barwice, 29 km (18 mi) west of Szczecinek, and 117 km (73 mi) east of the regional capital Szczecin.
