= Gąski, Szczecinek County =

Gąski
- Settlement
- Location within Poland
- Coordinates: 53°47′38″N 16°22′34″E
- Country: Poland
- Voivodeship: West Pomeranian
- County: Szczecinek
- Gmina: Barwice

Gąski [ˈɡɔ̃skʲi] (German: Altmühl) is a settlement in the administrative district of Gmina Barwice, within Szczecinek County, West Pomeranian Voivodeship, in north-western Poland. It lies approximately 7 km (4 mi) north of Barwice, 22 km (14 mi) north-west of Szczecinek, and 126 km (78 mi) east of the regional capital Szczecin.

For the history of the region, see History of Pomerania.
