= Uradz =

- Village
- Location within Poland
- Coordinates: 53°40′43″N 16°18′36″E
- Country: Poland
- Voivodeship: West Pomeranian
- County: Szczecinek
- Gmina: Barwice
- Population: 40

Uradz [ˈurat͡s] is a village in the administrative district of Gmina Barwice, within Szczecinek County, West Pomeranian Voivodeship, in north-western Poland. It lies approximately 7 km (4 mi) south-west of Barwice, 25 km (16 mi) west of Szczecinek, and 118 km (73 mi) east of the regional capital Szczecin.

For the history of the region, see History of Pomerania.

The village has a population of 40.
