= Chwalimka =

Chwalimki
- Settlement
- Location within Poland
- Coordinates: 53°47′6″N 16°24′34″E
- Country: Poland
- Voivodeship: West Pomeranian
- County: Szczecinek
- Gmina: Barwice

Chwalimki [xfaˈlʲimka] is a settlement in the administrative district of Gmina Barwice, within Szczecinek County, West Pomeranian Voivodeship, in north-western Poland. It lies approximately 7 km (4 mi) north-east of Barwice, 20 km (12 mi) north-west of Szczecinek, and 128 km (80 mi) east of the regional capital Szczecin.

For the history of the region, see History of Pomerania.
