= Wiele =

Wiele may refer to the following places in Poland:

- Wiele, Kuyavian-Pomeranian Voivodeship
- Wiele, Pomeranian Voivodeship

== See also ==
- Van de Wiele
