= Krajeńska =

Krajeńska may refer to the following places in Poland:

- Kozia Góra Krajeńska
- Krępa Krajeńska
- Wysoka Krajeńska
