= Hvězda =

Hvězda is the Czech word for "star" and may refer to:

- Rudá Hvězda Brno, a defunct sports club
- Rudá Hvězda Cheb, the communistic name for a football club now known as FK Union Cheb
- Letohrádek Hvězda, a villa in Prague

== See also ==
- Hviezdoslav
- Gwiazdowo (disambiguation)
