= Kobacz =

- Settlement
- Location within Poland
- Coordinates: 53°39′49″N 16°17′6″E
- Country: Poland
- Voivodeship: West Pomeranian
- County: Szczecinek
- Gmina: Barwice

Kobacz [ˈkɔbat͡ʂ] is a settlement in the administrative district of Gmina Barwice, within Szczecinek County, West Pomeranian Voivodeship, in north-western Poland. It lies approximately 9 km (6 mi) south-west of Barwice, 27 km (17 mi) west of Szczecinek, and 116 km (72 mi) east of the regional capital Szczecin.
