= Lubostronie =

- Village
- Location within Poland
- Coordinates: 53°45′51″N 16°19′54″E
- Country: Poland
- Voivodeship: West Pomeranian
- County: Szczecinek
- Gmina: Barwice

Lubostronie [lubɔsˈtrɔɲɛ] is a village in the administrative district of Gmina Barwice, within Szczecinek County, West Pomeranian Voivodeship, in north-western Poland. It lies approximately 4 km (2 mi) north of Barwice, 24 km (15 mi) west of Szczecinek, and 122 km (76 mi) east of the regional capital Szczecin.

For the history of the region, see History of Pomerania.
