= Korzec (disambiguation) =

Korzec is a former name of Korets in Ukraine.

Korzec may also refer to:

- Korzec, a Pomeranian village in Poland
- korzec, the Polish bushel
