= Stare Koprzywno =

- Village
- Location within Poland
- Coordinates: 53°43′44″N 16°16′54″E
- Country: Poland
- Voivodeship: West Pomeranian
- County: Szczecinek
- Gmina: Barwice
- Population: 0

Stare Koprzywno [ˈstarɛ kɔˈpʂɨvnɔ] (German: Alt Koprieben) is a former village in the administrative district of Gmina Barwice, within Szczecinek County, West Pomeranian Voivodeship, in north-western Poland. It lies approximately 5 km (3 mi) west of Barwice, 27 km (17 mi) west of Szczecinek, and 118 km (73 mi) east of the regional capital Szczecin.
