= Białowąs =

- Village
- Location within Poland
- Coordinates: 53°49′N 16°17′E
- Country: Poland
- Voivodeship: West Pomeranian
- County: Szczecinek
- Gmina: Barwice
- Population: 400

Białowąs [bʲaˈwɔvɔ̃s] (German: Balfanz) is a village in the administrative district of Gmina Barwice, within Szczecinek County, West Pomeranian Voivodeship, in north-western Poland. It lies approximately 11 km (7 mi) north-west of Barwice, 29 km (18 mi) north-west of Szczecinek, and 121 km (75 mi) east of the regional capital Szczecin.

The village has a population of 400.
