= Brzeźno, Gmina Barwice =

Brzeźno
- Settlement
- Location within Poland
- Coordinates: 53°47′0″N 16°16′35″E
- Country: Poland
- Voivodeship: West Pomeranian
- County: Szczecinek
- Gmina: Barwice

Brzeźno [ˈbʐɛʑnɔ] is a settlement in the administrative district of Gmina Barwice, within Szczecinek County, West Pomeranian Voivodeship, in north-western Poland. It lies approximately 8 km (5 mi) north-west of Barwice, 28 km (17 mi) west of Szczecinek, and 120 km (75 mi) east of the regional capital Szczecin.
