= Bącki =

- Settlement
- Location within Poland
- Coordinates: 53°42′4″N 16°22′1″E
- Country: Poland
- Voivodeship: West Pomeranian
- County: Szczecinek
- Gmina: Barwice

Bącki [ˈbɔnt͡skʲi] is a settlement in the administrative district of Gmina Barwice, within Szczecinek County, West Pomeranian Voivodeship, in north-western Poland. It lies approximately 4 km (2 mi) south of Barwice, 21 km (13 mi) west of Szczecinek, and 123 km (76 mi) east of the regional capital Szczecin.
