= Drążno =

Drążno may refer to the following places in Poland:

- Drążno, Kuyavian-Pomeranian Voivodeship
- Drążno, Masovian Voivodeship
- Drążno-Holendry
