= Polne, West Pomeranian Voivodeship =

Polne
- Village
- Location within Poland
- Coordinates: 53°39′N 16°19′E
- Country: Poland
- Voivodeship: West Pomeranian
- County: Szczecinek
- Gmina: Barwice

Polne [ˈpɔlnɛ] (German: Pöhlen) is a village in the administrative district of Gmina Barwice, within Szczecinek County, West Pomeranian Voivodeship, in north-western Poland. It lies approximately 10 km (6 mi) south of Barwice, 26 km (16 mi) west of Szczecinek, and 118 km (73 mi) east of the regional capital Szczecin.
