= Jagielnik, West Pomeranian Voivodeship =

Jagielnik
- Settlement
- Location within Poland
- Coordinates: 53°49′37″N 16°18′58″E
- Country: Poland
- Voivodeship: West Pomeranian
- County: Szczecinek
- Gmina: Barwice

Jagielnik (Polish pronunciation: [jaˈɡʲɛlɲik]) is a settlement in the administrative district of Gmina Barwice, within Szczecinek County, West Pomeranian Voivodeship, in north-western Poland. It lies approximately 11 km (7 mi) north of Barwice, 28 km (17 mi) north-west of Szczecinek, and 124 km (77 mi) east of the regional capital Szczecin. Between 1975 and 1998 the town administratively belonged to the Koszalin voivodeship.

For the history of the region, see History of Pomerania.
