= Dobrzycko =

- Settlement
- Location within Poland
- Coordinates: 53°49′38″N 16°14′20″E
- Country: Poland
- Voivodeship: West Pomeranian
- County: Szczecinek
- Gmina: Barwice

Dobrzycko [dɔˈbʐɨt͡skɔ] is a settlement in the administrative district of Gmina Barwice, within Szczecinek County, West Pomeranian Voivodeship, in north-western Poland. It lies approximately 13 km (8 mi) north-west of Barwice, 32 km (20 mi) north-west of Szczecinek, and 119 km (74 mi) north-east of the regional capital Szczecin.

For the history of the region, see History of Pomerania.
