= Świerk =

Świerk may refer to:

- Świerk, West Pomeranian Voivodeship

== People with the surname ==
- Stanisław Świerk
