= Luboradza =

- Village
- Location within Poland
- Coordinates: 53°43′58″N 16°16′43″E
- Country: Poland
- Voivodeship: West Pomeranian
- County: Szczecinek
- Gmina: Barwice
- Population: 30

Luboradza [lubɔˈrad͡za] is a village in the administrative district of Gmina Barwice, within Szczecinek County, West Pomeranian Voivodeship, in north-western Poland. It lies approximately 5 km (3 mi) west of Barwice, 27 km (17 mi) west of Szczecinek, and 118 km (73 mi) east of the regional capital Szczecin. It is part of the former historic village of Alt Koprieben/Coprieben (Pomerania maps dating 1891 and 1893) and became Stare Koprzywno after 1945. The village was abandoned and is now known as Luboradza.

For the history of the region, see History of Pomerania.

The village has a population of 30.
