= Śmilcz =

- Village
- Location within Poland
- Coordinates: 53°44′7″N 16°23′57″E
- Country: Poland
- Voivodeship: West Pomeranian
- County: Szczecinek
- Gmina: Barwice
- Population: 60

Śmilcz [ɕmʲilt͡ʂ] is a village in the administrative district of Gmina Barwice, within Szczecinek County, West Pomeranian Voivodeship, in north-western Poland. It lies approximately 4 km (2 mi) east of Barwice, 19 km (12 mi) west of Szczecinek, and 126 km (78 mi) east of the regional capital Szczecin.

For the history of the region, see History of Pomerania.

The village has a population of 60.
