= Nowy Chwalim =

- Village
- Location within Poland
- Coordinates: 53°46′N 16°29′E
- Country: Poland
- Voivodeship: West Pomeranian
- County: Szczecinek
- Gmina: Barwice

Nowy Chwalim [ˈnɔvɨ ˈxfalʲim] (German: Neu Valm) is a village in the administrative district of Gmina Barwice, within Szczecinek County, West Pomeranian Voivodeship, in north-western Poland. It lies approximately 10 km (6 mi) north-east of Barwice, 15 km (9 mi) north-west of Szczecinek, and 132 km (82 mi) east of the regional capital Szczecin.

For the history of the region, see History of Pomerania.
