= Matyldzin =

Matyldzin may refer to the following places in Poland:

- Matyldzin, Kuyavian-Pomeranian Voivodeship
- Matyldzin, Masovian Voivodeship
