= Borzęcino, Gmina Barwice =

Borzęcino
- Village
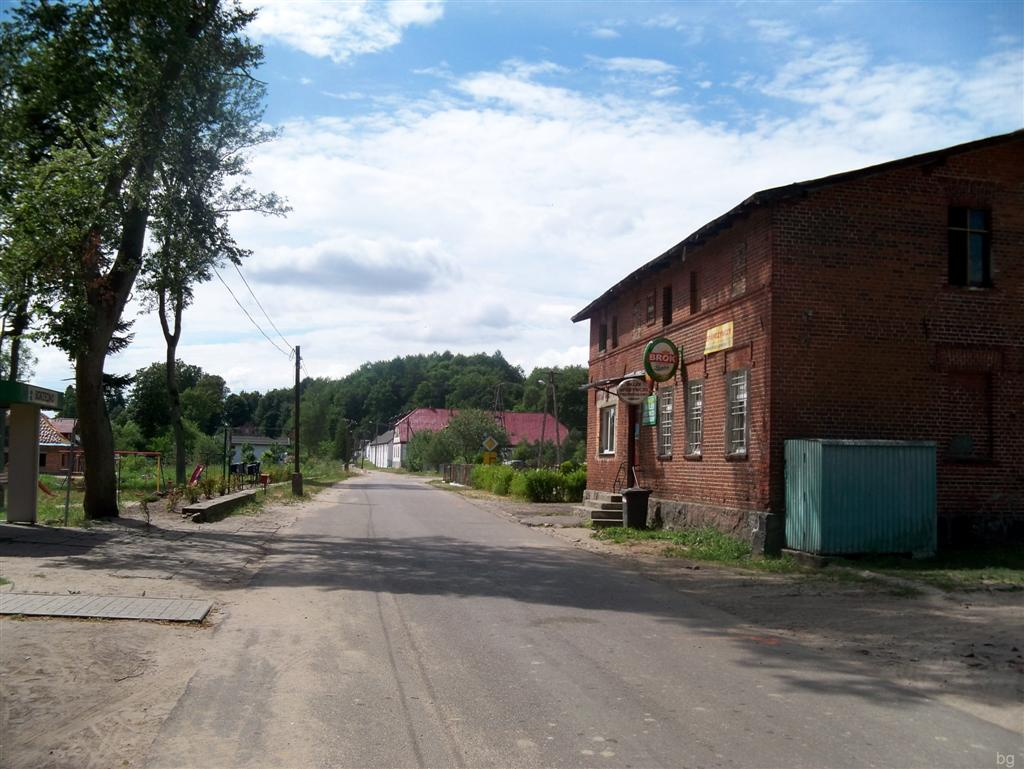

- Location within Poland
- Coordinates: 53°50′06″N 16°14′12″E
- Country: Poland
- Voivodeship: West Pomeranian
- County: Szczecinek
- Gmina: Barwice

Borzęcino [bɔʐɛnˈt͡ɕinɔ] (German: Borntin) is a village in the administrative district of Gmina Barwice, within Szczecinek County, West Pomeranian Voivodeship, in north-western Poland.

== Notable residents ==
- Karl Decker (1897–1945)
