= Karl Decker =

German panzer general

- Born: 30 November 1897; Borntin, Farther Pomerania, German Empire
- Died: 21 April 1945 (aged 47); Braunschweig, Lower Saxony, Nazi Germany
- Military career
- Allegiance: German Empire; Weimar Republic; Nazi Germany
- Branch: German Army
- Service years: 1914–1945
- Rank: General der Panzertruppe
- Commands: 5th Panzer Division; XXXIX Panzer Korps
- Conflicts: World War I World War II
- Awards: Knight's Cross of the Iron Cross with Oak Leaves and Swords

Karl Decker (30 November 1897 – 21 April 1945) was a general in the Wehrmacht of Nazi Germany during World War II who committed suicide in the Ruhr Pocket on 21 April 1945. He was a recipient of the Knight's Cross of the Iron Cross with Oak Leaves and Swords.

== Military career ==
Karl Decker was born on 30 November 1897 as son to an officer in Borntin in Pomerania. He joined the military service on 3 August 1914 and first saw action in East Prussia. He was promoted to an officer candidate for bravery before the enemy and also was awarded the Iron Cross (1914) 2nd Class. Decker was again promoted in 1915 to Leutnant and shortly afterwards received the Iron Cross 1st Class. That same year, he fought in Poland, Russia and Courland (now Latvia) He then served as Zugführer (platoon leader) of a machine gun unit after he was transferred to the Feldkriegsschule of the German 8th Army in 1916. He was transferred to the Western Front in the spring of 1917 and fought in the Battle of Lys where his division suffered heavy casualties. He then held the position of battalion adjutant. During 1918, he was assigned to the Infantry School in Döberitz as a weapons instructor.

After the capitulation of the German Empire, Decker was accepted into the Reichswehr in 1920 and served with the 29th Reserve Jäger Regiment, the 5th Jäger Regiment and the 6th cavalry Regiment. He was promoted to Oberleutnant and Rittmeister during these assignments. As a major, he was transferred to the staff of the 5th Cavalry Regiment together with Horst Niemack. Shortly afterwards, he was reassigned again, this time to the 38th Armoured Detachment in Mühlhausen. He later became the commanding officer of this unit.

This unit was subordinated to the 2nd Panzer division during the Invasion of Poland and fought under the command of Decker near Kraków and the Jablonka Pass. During the Battle of France, Decker commanded a battalion of the 3rd Panzer regiment in the 2nd Panzer division. This unit fought at the Maas, near Sedan, Saint-Quentin and Abbeville.

In Balkans Campaign, his regiment fought in Yugoslavia, northern Greece, occupied Athens and crossed the Corinth Canal. Decker was put in command of 3rd Panzer regiment before Operation Barbarossa began. In the spring of 1942, he was transferred to the staff of the 9th Army. In April 1943, he appointed commander of the 5th Panzer Division. He received the Oak Leaves to the Knight's Cross on 4 May 1944 and promoted to Generalleutnant.

Decker was appointed commander of the XXXIX Panzer Corps that was attached to the 3rd Panzer Army and promoted to General der Panzertruppe on 1 January 1945. After his unit was relocated to the Western Front, his corps fought the Americans at Uelzen and in the Alsace. Here the 5th Panzer Army was subordinated to Army Group B. Decker committed suicide on 21 April 1945 after the defeat and encirclement of the Army Group in the Ruhr Pocket in April.

== Awards ==
- Iron Cross (1914) 2nd Class (22 June 1915) & 1st Class (1 November 1916)
- Hanseatic Cross of Hamburg (20 December 1917)
- Wehrmacht Long Service Award 2nd Class (2 October 1936) & 1st Class (3 August 1939)
- Clasp to the Iron Cross (1939) 2nd Class (27 September 1939) & 1st Class (20 November 1939)
- Wound Badge (1939) in Black (26 June 1940)
- Eastern Front Medal (15 July 1942)
- Panzer Badge in Bronze (2 November 1943)
- German Cross in Gold on 1 August 1942 as Oberst in the Panzer-Regiment 3
- Knight's Cross of the Iron Cross with Oak Leaves and Swords
  - Knight's Cross on 13 June 1941 and Oberstleutnant and commander of the I./Panzer-Regiment 3
  - Oak Leaves on 4 May 1944 as Generalmajor and commander of the 5. Panzer-Division
  - Swords on 26 April 1945 (posthumous) as General der Panzertruppe and commanding general of the XXXIX. Panzerkorps (Note: The German Federal Archives hold no records for the presentation of the Swords. Scherzer states Decker's widow claimed that she had been informed that her husband had received the award. The date was assigned by the AKCR.)

== Notes ==
Military offices
Preceded by Generalleutnant Ernst Felix Fäckenstedt	Commander of 5. Panzer-Division; 7 September 1943 – 16 October 1944	Succeeded by Generalmajor Rolf Lippert
Preceded by General der Panzertruppe Dietrich von Saucken	Commander of XXXIX. Panzer-Korps; 15 October 1944 – 21 April 1945	Succeeded by Generalleutnant Karl Arndt
