= Kolonia Przybkowo =

- Settlement
- Location within Poland
- Coordinates: 53°42′55″N 16°19′20″E
- Country: Poland
- Voivodeship: West Pomeranian
- County: Szczecinek
- Gmina: Barwice

Kolonia Przybkowo [kɔˈlɔɲa pʂɨpˈkɔvɔ] is a settlement in the administrative district of Gmina Barwice, within Szczecinek County, West Pomeranian Voivodeship, in north-western Poland. It lies approximately 3 km (2 mi) south-west of Barwice, 24 km (15 mi) west of Szczecinek, and 120 km (75 mi) east of the regional capital Szczecin.

For the history of the region, see History of Pomerania.
