= Mrocza =

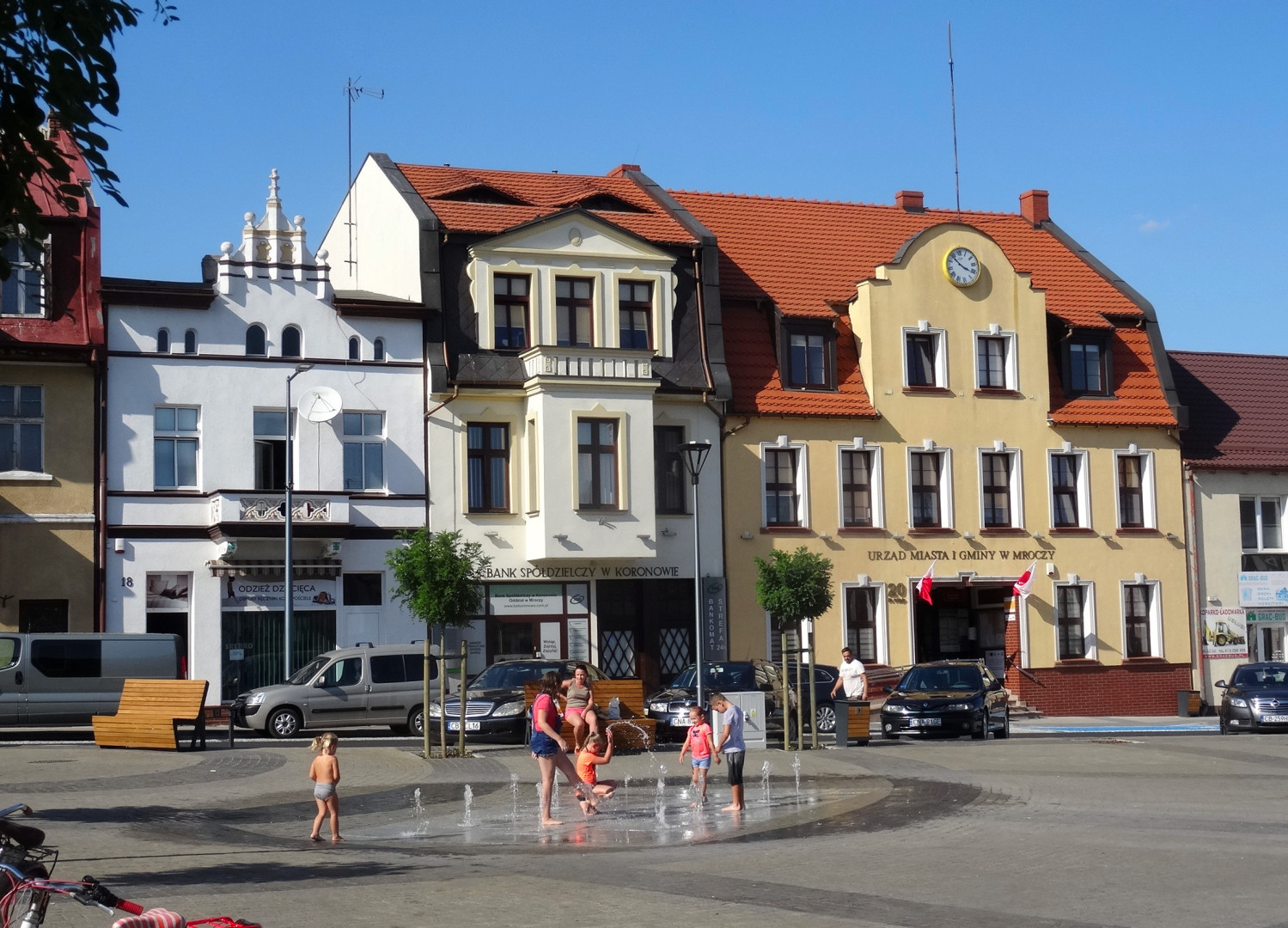
- Town square

- Coat of arms

- Location within Poland
- Coordinates: 53°14′33″N 17°35′56″E
- Country: Poland
- Voivodeship: Kuyavian-Pomeranian
- County: Nakło
- Gmina: Mrocza
- Town rights: 1393

Area
  - Total: 4.32 km^{2} (1.67 sq mi)

Population (2010)
  - Total: 4,368
  - Density: 1,010/km^{2} (2,620/sq mi)
- Time zone: UTC+1 (CET)
  - Summer (DST): UTC+2 (CEST)
- Postal code: 89-115
- Vehicle registration: CNA
- Website: http://www.mrocza.pl/

Mrocza (Polish pronunciation: [ˈmrɔt͡ʂa]) is a town in Nakło County, Kuyavian-Pomeranian Voivodeship, northern Poland, with 4,368 inhabitants (2010). It is located in the ethnocultural region of Krajna.

== History ==
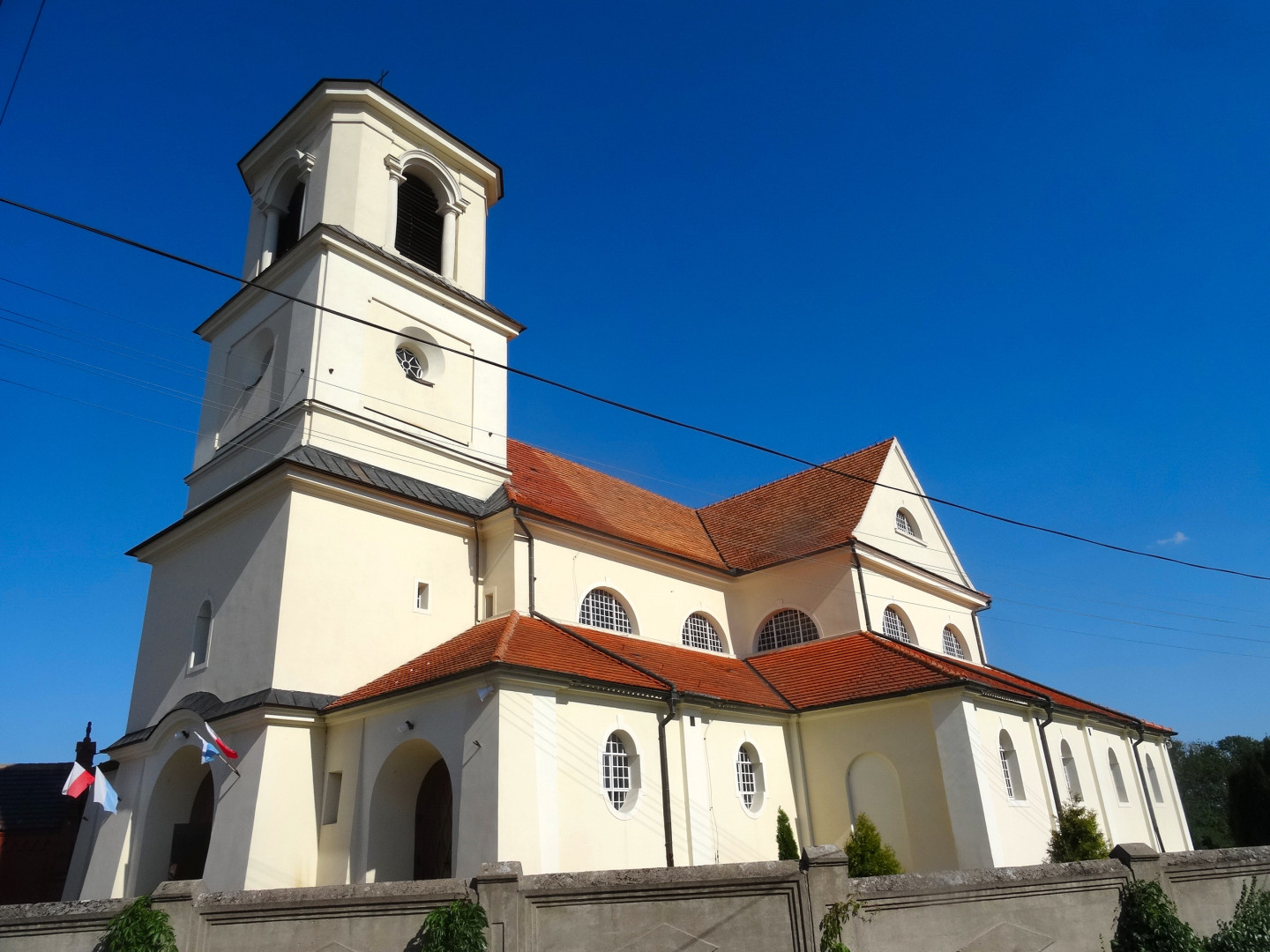
Saint Nicholas and Assumption church

Mrocza was granted town rights by Polish King Władysław II Jagiełło in 1393. It was a private town, administratively located in the Nakło County in the Kalisz Voivodeship in the Greater Poland Province.

Following the joint German-Soviet invasion of Poland, which started World War II in September 1939, the town was invaded, and then occupied by Germany. In October–November 1939, as part of the Intelligenzaktion, the German gendarmerie and Selbstschutz carried out mass arrests of local Poles, including the town's mayor. Arrested Poles were then murdered by the Germans in large massacres, including in nearby Paterek. Two Poles from Mrocza were also murdered by the Russians in the large Katyn massacre in April–May 1940. The Germans also carried out expulsions of Poles, and in 1942, they renamed the town Immenheim to erase traces of Polish origin, however the historic name was restored after the German occupation ended in 1945.

== Demographics ==
Historical population
Year	Pop.	±%
1921	2,016	—
1931	2,383	+18.2%
2010	4,368	+83.3%

== Sports ==
Tarpan Mrocza sports club is based in the town, with football, weightlifting and duplicate bridge sections. It is the former club of Adrian Zieliński, 2012 Olympic champion in weightlifting.
