= Rajgród, Kuyavian-Pomeranian Voivodeship =

Rajgród
- Village
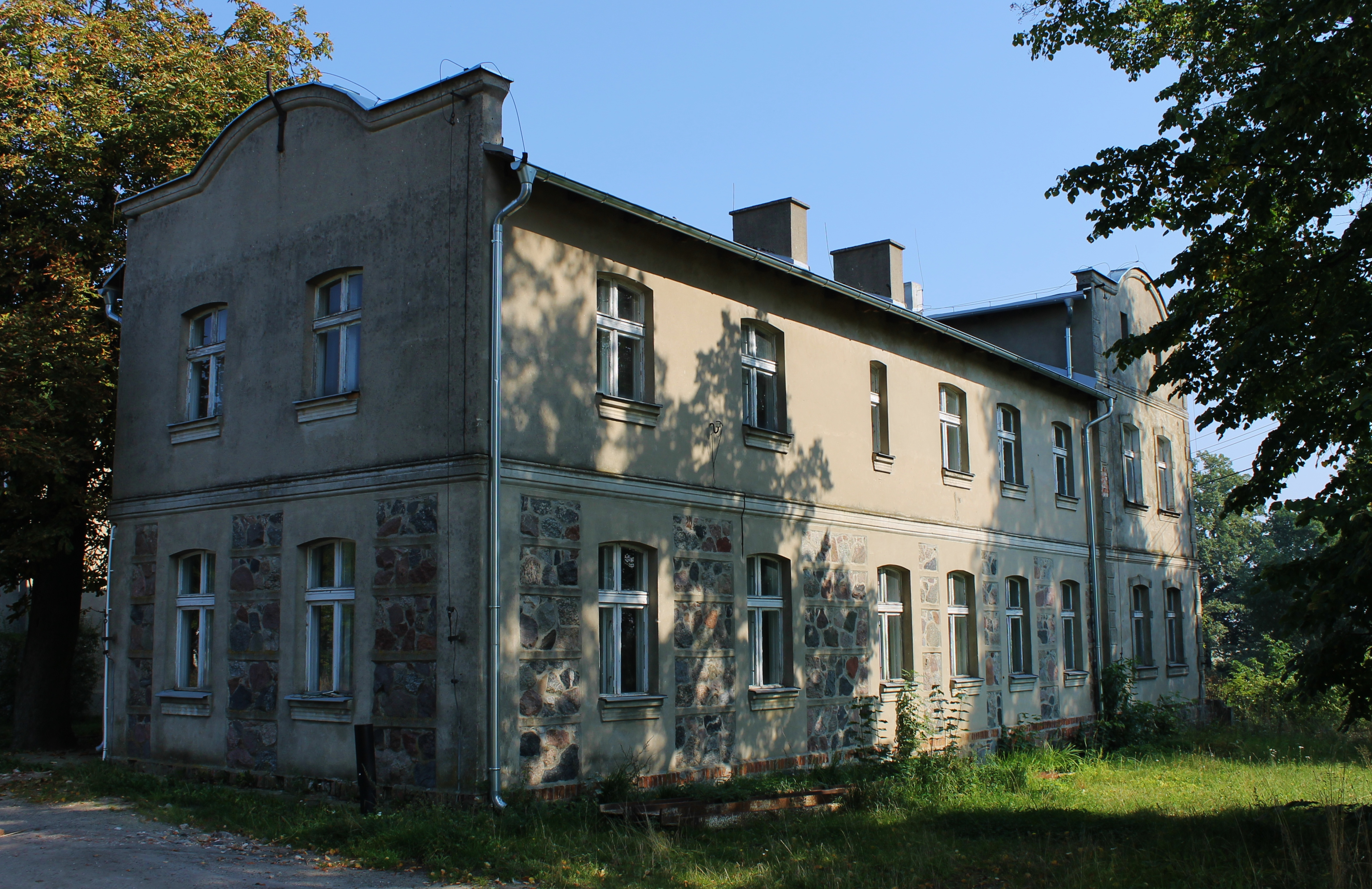
- Manor in Rajgród

- Location within Poland
- Coordinates: 53°16′N 17°27′E
- Country: Poland
- Voivodeship: Kuyavian-Pomeranian
- County: Nakło
- Gmina: Mrocza

Rajgród [ˈrai̯ɡrut] is a village in the administrative district of Gmina Mrocza, within Nakło County, Kuyavian-Pomeranian Voivodeship, in north-central Poland.
