= Orle, Nakło County =

Orle
- Village
- Location within Poland
- Coordinates: 53°14′39″N 17°31′05″E
- Country: Poland
- Voivodeship: Kuyavian-Pomeranian
- County: Nakło
- Gmina: Mrocza

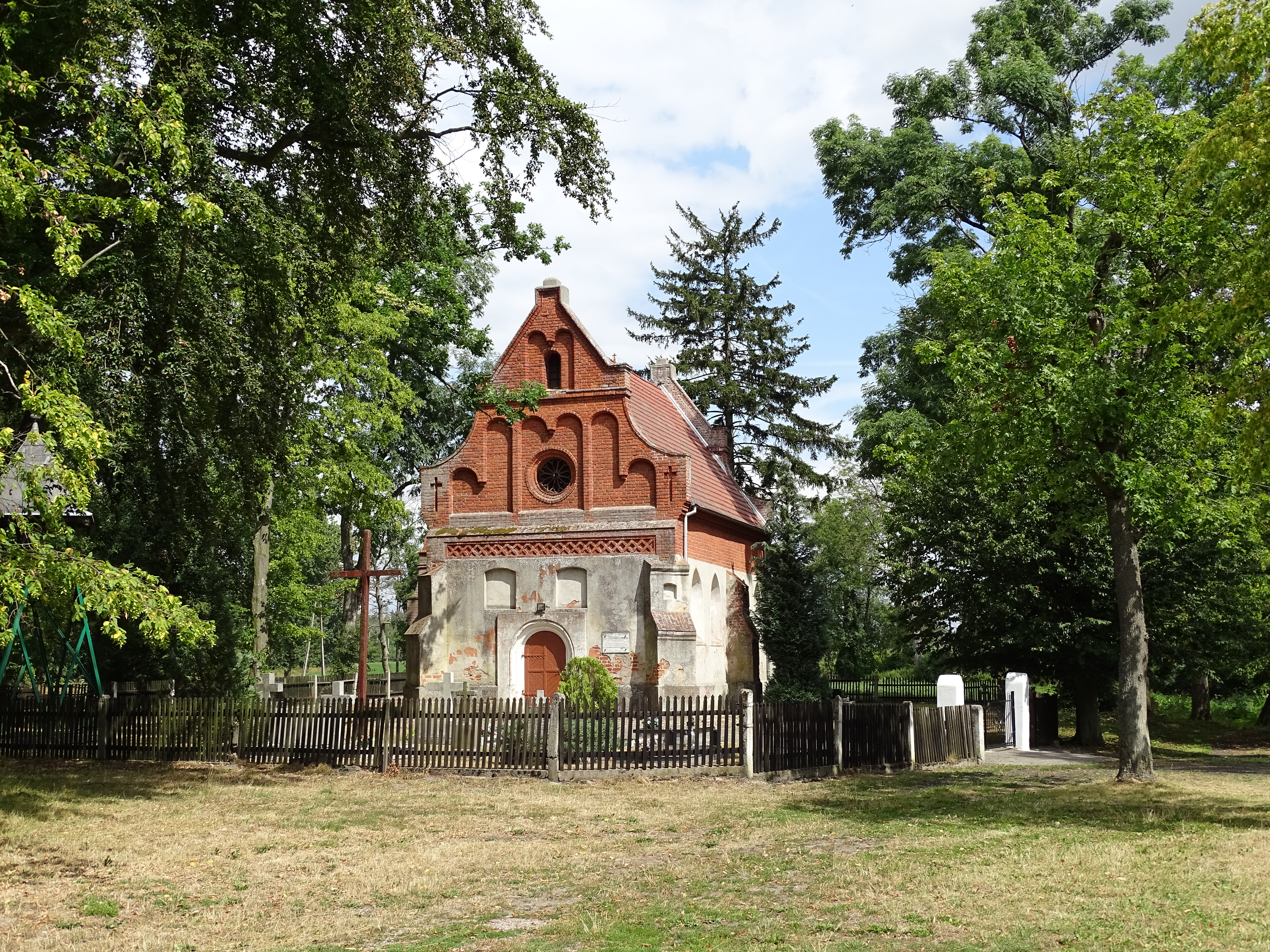
Church of St. Matthias.

Orle [ˈɔrlɛ] is a village in the administrative district of Gmina Mrocza, within Nakło County, Kuyavian-Pomeranian Voivodeship, in north-central Poland.
