= Kłodzino, Szczecinek County =

Kłodzino
- Village
- Location within Poland
- Coordinates: 53°47′08″N 16°14′36″E
- Country: Poland
- Voivodeship: West Pomeranian
- County: Szczecinek
- Gmina: Barwice

Kłodzino [kwɔˈd͡ʑinɔ] (German: Klotzen) is a village in the administrative district of Gmina Barwice, within Szczecinek County, West Pomeranian Voivodeship, in north-western Poland.

For the history of the region, see History of Pomerania.
