= Konstantowo, Nakło County =

Konstantowo
- Village
- Location within Poland
- Coordinates: 53°16′21″N 17°35′36″E
- Country: Poland
- Voivodeship: Kuyavian-Pomeranian
- County: Nakło
- Gmina: Mrocza
- Population: 130

Konstantowo [kɔnstanˈtɔvɔ] is a village in the administrative district of Gmina Mrocza, within Nakło County, Kuyavian-Pomeranian Voivodeship, in north-central Poland.
