= Rościmin =

- Village
- Location within Poland
- Coordinates: 53°17′N 17°30′E
- Country: Poland
- Voivodeship: Kuyavian-Pomeranian
- County: Nakło
- Gmina: Mrocza

Rościmin [rɔɕˈt͡ɕimin] is a village in the administrative district of Gmina Mrocza, within Nakło County, Kuyavian-Pomeranian Voivodeship, in north-central Poland.
