= Nowy Grabiąż =

- Settlement
- Location within Poland
- Coordinates: 53°42′43″N 16°22′42″E
- Country: Poland
- Voivodeship: West Pomeranian
- County: Szczecinek
- Gmina: Barwice

Nowy Grabiąż [ˈnɔvɨ ˈɡrabʲɔ̃ʂ] (German: Neu Grabunz) is a settlement in the administrative district of Gmina Barwice, within Szczecinek County, West Pomeranian Voivodeship, in north-western Poland. It lies approximately 4 km (2 mi) south-east of Barwice, 21 km (13 mi) west of Szczecinek, and 124 km (77 mi) east of the regional capital Szczecin.

For the history of the region, see History of Pomerania.
