= Gonne Małe =

- Village
- Location within Poland
- Coordinates: 53°42′49″N 16°21′54″E
- Country: Poland
- Voivodeship: West Pomeranian
- County: Szczecinek
- Gmina: Barwice

Gonne Małe [ˈɡɔnːɛ ˈmawɛ] (German: Gönne) is a village in the administrative district of Gmina Barwice, within Szczecinek County, West Pomeranian Voivodeship, in north-western Poland.

For the history of the region, see History of Pomerania.
