= Gmina Mrocza =

Gmina Mrocza Mrocza Commune
- Gmina
- Coat of arms
- Interactive map of Gmina Mrocza
- Coordinates (Mrocza): 53°14′33″N 17°35′56″E
- Country: Poland
- Voivodeship: Kuyavian-Pomeranian
- County: Nakło
- Seat: Mrocza

Area
  - Total: 150.71 km^{2} (58.19 sq mi)

Population (2006)
  - Total: 9,141
  - Density: 60.65/km^{2} (157.1/sq mi)
  - Urban: 4,203
  - Rural: 4,938
- Website: http://www.mrocza.pl/

Gmina Mrocza is an urban-rural gmina (administrative district) in Nakło County, Kuyavian-Pomeranian Voivodeship, in north-central Poland. Its seat is the town of Mrocza, which lies approximately 12 kilometres (7 mi) north of Nakło nad Notecią and 31 km (19 mi) north-west of Bydgoszcz.

The gmina covers an area of 150.71 square kilometres (58.2 sq mi), and as of 2006 its total population is 9,141 (out of which the population of Mrocza amounts to 4,203, and the population of the rural part of the gmina is 4,938).

The gmina contains part of the protected area called Krajna Landscape Park.

== Villages ==
Apart from the town of Mrocza, Gmina Mrocza contains the villages and settlements of Białowieża, Chwałka, Dąbrowice, Drążno, Drążonek, Drzewianowo, Izabela, Jadwigowo, Jeziorki Zabartowskie, Kaźmierzewo, Konstantowo, Kosowo, Kozia Góra Krajeńska, Krukówko, Matyldzin, Modrakowo, Orle, Orlinek, Orzelski Młyn, Ostrowo, Podgórz, Rajgród, Rościmin, Samsieczynek, Słupówko, Wiele, Witosław, Wyrza and Zdrogowo.

== Neighbouring gminas ==
Gmina Mrocza is bordered by the gminas of Łobżenica, Nakło nad Notecią, Sadki, Sicienko, Sośno and Więcbork.
