= Trzemienko =

- Village
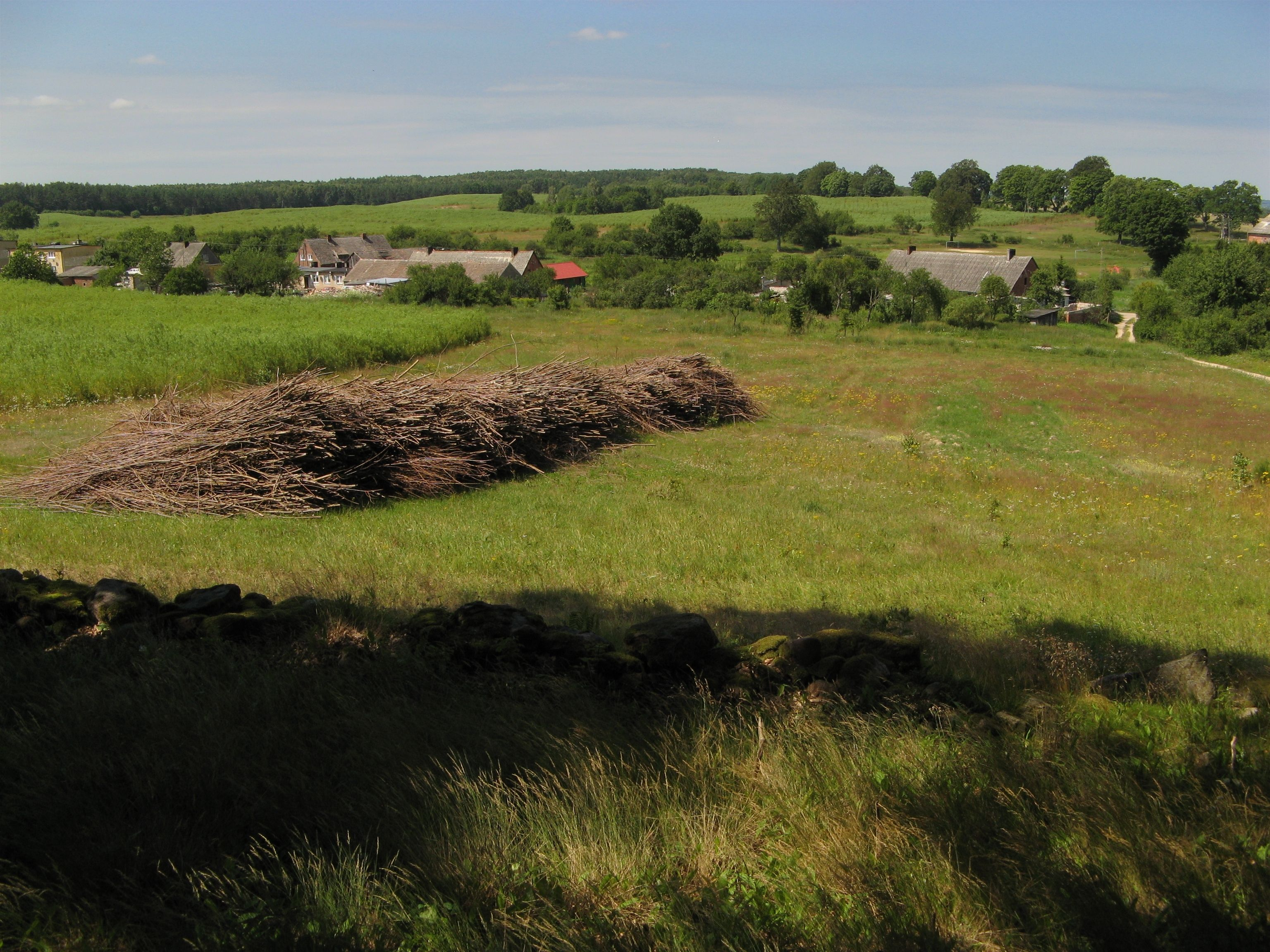

- Location within Poland
- Coordinates: 53°41′04″N 16°20′32″E
- Country: Poland
- Voivodeship: West Pomeranian
- County: Szczecinek
- Gmina: Barwice

Trzemienko [tʂɛˈmʲɛŋkɔ] is a village in the administrative district of Gmina Barwice, within Szczecinek County, West Pomeranian Voivodeship, in north-western Poland.

For the history of the region, see History of Pomerania.
