= Witosław, Kuyavian-Pomeranian Voivodeship =

Witosław
- Village
- Location within Poland
- Coordinates: 53°15′N 17°29′E
- Country: Poland
- Voivodeship: Kuyavian-Pomeranian
- County: Nakło
- Gmina: Mrocza
- Population: 700
- Website: www.witoslaw-wita.prv.pl

Witosław [viˈtɔswaf] is a village in the administrative district of Gmina Mrocza, within Nakło County, Kuyavian-Pomeranian Voivodeship, in north-central Poland.
