= Kolonia Sulikowo =

- Settlement
- Location within Poland
- Coordinates: 53°46′46″N 16°19′43″E
- Country: Poland
- Voivodeship: West Pomeranian
- County: Szczecinek
- Gmina: Barwice

Kolonia Sulikowo [kɔˈlɔɲa sulʲiˈkɔvɔ] is a settlement in the administrative district of Gmina Barwice, within Szczecinek County, West Pomeranian Voivodeship, in north-western Poland. It lies approximately 6 km (4 mi) north of Barwice, 25 km (16 mi) west of Szczecinek, and 123 km (76 mi) east of the regional capital Szczecin.

For the history of the region, see History of Pomerania.
