= Sulikowo, Szczecinek County =

Sulikowo
- Village
- Location within Poland
- Coordinates: 53°48′N 16°20′E
- Country: Poland
- Voivodeship: West Pomeranian
- County: Szczecinek
- Gmina: Barwice

Sulikowo [sulʲiˈkɔvɔ] (German: Zülkenhagen) is a village in the administrative district of Gmina Barwice, within Szczecinek County, West Pomeranian Voivodeship, in north-western Poland. It lies approximately 8 km (5 mi) north of Barwice, 25 km (16 mi) west of Szczecinek, and 124 km (77 mi) east of the regional capital Szczecin.

The settlement's German name indicates that the village was founded in the Middle Ages by German settlers.

For the history of the region, see History of Pomerania.
