= Modrakowo =

- Village
- Location within Poland
- Coordinates: 53°11′38″N 17°34′3″E
- Country: Poland
- Voivodeship: Kuyavian-Pomeranian
- County: Nakło
- Gmina: Mrocza
- Population: 160

Modrakowo [mɔdraˈkɔvɔ] is a village in the administrative district of Gmina Mrocza, within Nakło County, Kuyavian-Pomeranian Voivodeship, in north-central Poland.
