= Stary Grabiąż =

- Village
- Location within Poland
- Coordinates: 53°43′N 16°23′E
- Country: Poland
- Voivodeship: West Pomeranian
- County: Szczecinek
- Gmina: Barwice

Stary Grabiąż [ˈstarɨ ˈɡrabʲɔ̃ʂ] (German: Grabunz) is a village in the administrative district of Gmina Barwice, within Szczecinek County, West Pomeranian Voivodeship, in north-western Poland. It lies approximately 3 km (2 mi) south-east of Barwice, 20 km (12 mi) west of Szczecinek, and 124 km (77 mi) east of the regional capital Szczecin.

For the history of the region, see History of Pomerania.
