= Drążonek =

- Village
- Location within Poland
- Coordinates: 53°12′30″N 17°37′51″E
- Country: Poland
- Voivodeship: Kuyavian-Pomeranian
- County: Nakło
- Gmina: Mrocza

Drążonek [drɔ̃ˈʐɔnɛk] is a village in the administrative district of Gmina Mrocza, in Nakło County, Kuyavian-Pomeranian Voivodeship, in north-central Poland.
