= Niemierzyno, Szczecinek County =

Niemierzyno
- Settlement
- Country: Poland
- Voivodeship: West Pomeranian
- County: Szczecinek
- Gmina: Barwice
- Time zone: UTC+01:00 (CET)
  - Summer (DST): UTC+02:00 (CEST)

Niemierzyno [ɲɛmʲɛˈʐɨnɔ] is a settlement in the administrative district of Gmina Barwice, within Szczecinek County, West Pomeranian Voivodeship, in north-western Poland.

For the history of the region, see History of Pomerania.
