= Izabela, Kuyavian-Pomeranian Voivodeship =

Izabela
- Village
- Location within Poland
- Coordinates: 53°14′32″N 17°26′59″E
- Country: Poland
- Voivodeship: Kuyavian-Pomeranian
- County: Nakło
- Gmina: Mrocza

Izabela [izaˈbɛla] is a village in the administrative district of Gmina Mrocza, within Nakło County, Kuyavian-Pomeranian Voivodeship, in north-central Poland.
