= Korzec, West Pomeranian Voivodeship =

Korzec
- Settlement
- Location within Poland
- Coordinates: 53°43′23″N 16°21′22″E
- Country: Poland
- Voivodeship: West Pomeranian
- County: Szczecinek
- Gmina: Barwice

Korzec [ˈkɔʐɛt͡s] is a settlement in the administrative district of Gmina Barwice, within Szczecinek County, West Pomeranian Voivodeship, in north-western Poland. It lies approximately 2 km (1 mi) south of Barwice, 22 km (14 mi) west of Szczecinek, and 123 km (76 mi) east of the regional capital Szczecin.

For the history of the region, see History of Pomerania.
