= Krukówko =

- Village
- Location within Poland
- Coordinates: 53°13′17″N 17°36′03″E
- Country: Poland
- Voivodeship: Kuyavian-Pomeranian
- County: Nakło
- Gmina: Mrocza
- Elevation: 115 m (377 ft)
- Population: 206

Krukówko [kruˈkufkɔ] is a village in the administrative district of Gmina Mrocza, within Nakło County, Kuyavian-Pomeranian Voivodeship, in north-central Poland.
