= Dąbrowice, Nakło County =

Dąbrowice
- Village
- Location within Poland
- Coordinates: 53°15′58″N 17°37′25″E
- Country: Poland
- Voivodeship: Kuyavian-Pomeranian
- County: Nakło
- Gmina: Mrocza

Dąbrowice [dɔmbrɔˈvit͡sɛ] is a village in the administrative district of Gmina Mrocza, within Nakło County, Kuyavian-Pomeranian Voivodeship, in north-central Poland.
