= Hvězdonice =

- Municipality
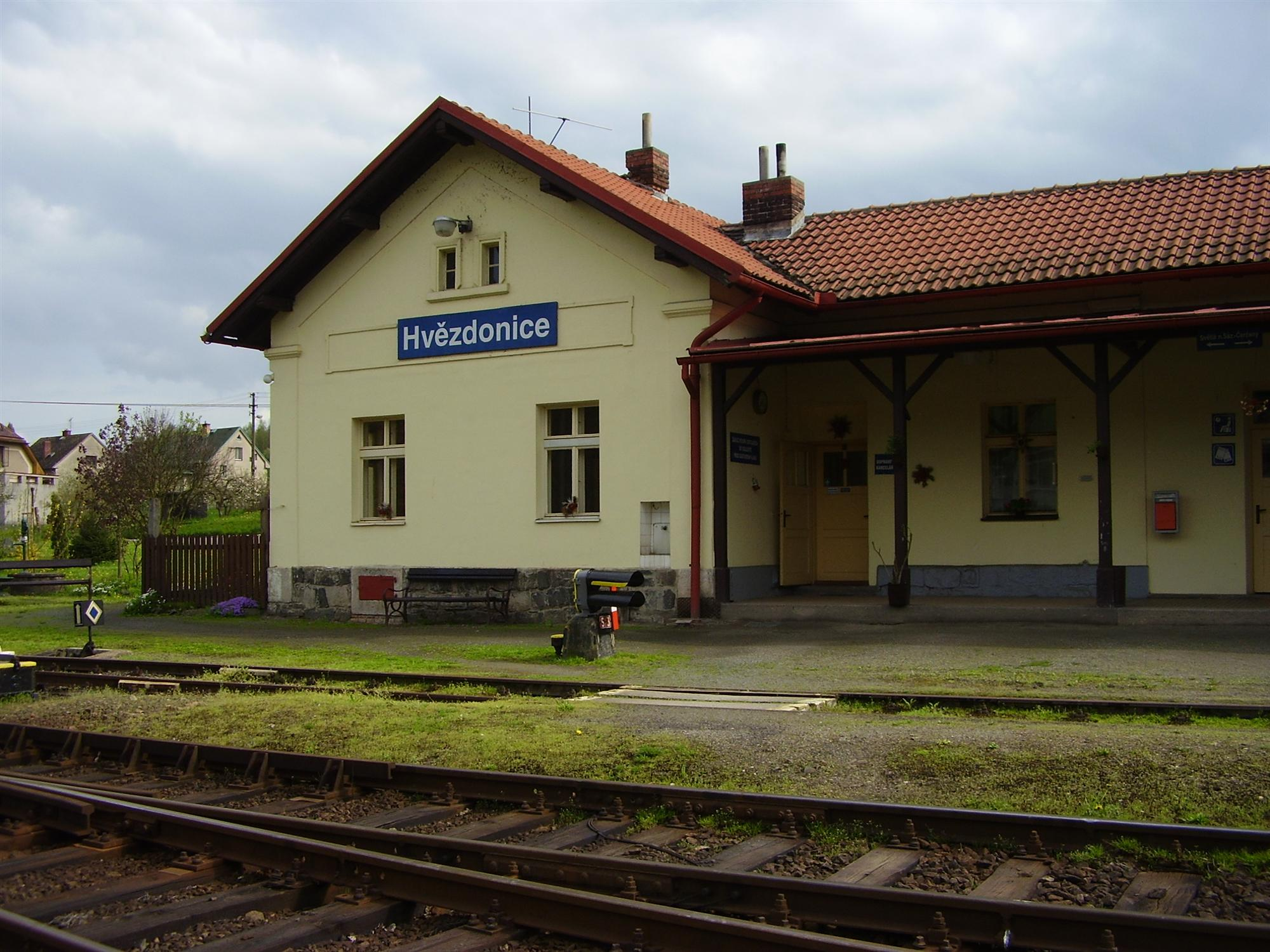
- Train station

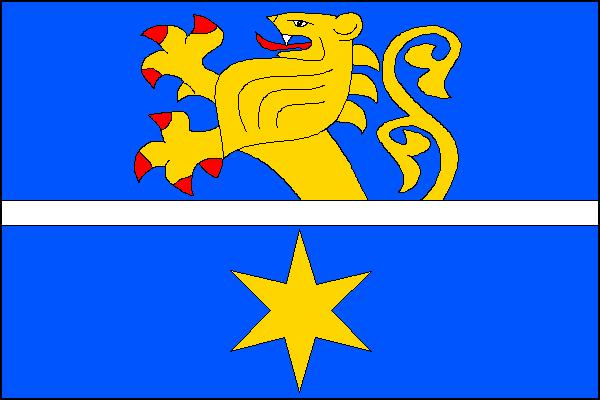
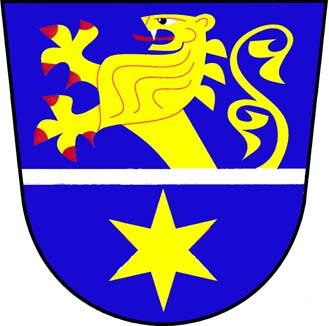
- Flag Coat of arms

- Location in the Czech Republic
- Coordinates: 49°52′22″N 14°46′38″E
- Country: Czech Republic
- Region: Central Bohemian
- District: Benešov
- First mentioned: 1422

Area
  - Total: 1.40 km^{2} (0.54 sq mi)
- Elevation: 283 m (928 ft)

Population (2026-01-01)
  - Total: 351
  - Density: 251/km^{2} (649/sq mi)
- Time zone: UTC+1 (CET)
  - Summer (DST): UTC+2 (CEST)
- Postal code: 257 24
- Website: www.hvezdonice.cz

Hvězdonice is a municipality and village in Benešov District in the Central Bohemian Region of the Czech Republic. It has about 400 inhabitants.

== Demographics ==
Historical population
Year	Pop.	±%
1869	110	—
1880	95	−13.6%
1890	94	−1.1%
1900	107	+13.8%
1910	130	+21.5%
1921	181	+39.2%
1930	313	+72.9%
1950	324	+3.5%
1961	478	+47.5%
1970	462	−3.3%
1980	399	−13.6%
1991	325	−18.5%
2001	315	−3.1%
2011	320	+1.6%
2021	361	+12.8%
Source: Censuses
