= Kozia Góra Krajeńska =

- Village
- Location within Poland
- Coordinates: 53°11′56″N 17°35′37″E
- Country: Poland
- Voivodeship: Kuyavian-Pomeranian
- County: Nakło
- Gmina: Mrocza
- Population: 110

Kozia Góra Krajeńska [ˈkɔʑa ˈɡura kraˈjɛɲska] is a village in the administrative district of Gmina Mrocza, within Nakło County, Kuyavian-Pomeranian Voivodeship, in north-central Poland.
