= Gwiazdowski =

Gwiazdowski (feminine Gwiazdowska) is a Polish surname. Notable people with the surname include:

- Grzegorz Gwiazdowski (born 1974), Polish racing cyclist
- Nick Gwiazdowski (born 1992), American freestyle wrestler
- Robert Gwiazdowski (born 1960), Polish jurist and economist
- Tadeusz Gwiazdowski (1918–1983), Polish actor
