= Drążno, Kuyavian-Pomeranian Voivodeship =

Drążno
- Village
- Location within Poland
- Coordinates: 53°13′08″N 17°38′33″E
- Country: Poland
- Voivodeship: Kuyavian-Pomeranian
- County: Nakło
- Gmina: Mrocza

Drążno [ˈdrɔ̃ʐnɔ] is a village in the administrative district of Gmina Mrocza, within Nakło County, Kuyavian-Pomeranian Voivodeship, in north-central Poland.
