= Jadwigowo, Kuyavian-Pomeranian Voivodeship =

Jadwigowo
- Village
- Location within Poland
- Coordinates: 53°14′53″N 17°32′52″E
- Country: Poland
- Voivodeship: Kuyavian-Pomeranian
- County: Nakło
- Gmina: Mrocza
- Population: 100

Jadwigowo (Polish pronunciation: [jadviˈɡɔvɔ]) is a village in the administrative district of Gmina Mrocza, within Nakło County, Kuyavian-Pomeranian Voivodeship, in north-central Poland.
