= Matyldzin, Kuyavian-Pomeranian Voivodeship =

Matyldzin
- Village
- Location within Poland
- Coordinates: 53°13′55″N 17°34′04″E
- Country: Poland
- Voivodeship: Kuyavian-Pomeranian
- County: Nakło
- Gmina: Mrocza

Matyldzin [maˈtɨld͡ʑin] is a village in the administrative district of Gmina Mrocza, within Nakło County, Kuyavian-Pomeranian Voivodeship, in north-central Poland.
