= Gwiazdowo =

Gwiazdowo may refer to:

- Gwiazdowo, Greater Poland Voivodeship (west-central Poland)
- Gwiazdowo, Warmian-Masurian Voivodeship (north Poland)
- Gwiazdowo, Sławno County in West Pomeranian Voivodeship (north-west Poland)
- Gwiazdowo, Szczecinek County in West Pomeranian Voivodeship (north-west Poland)
