= Gwiazdowo, Szczecinek County =

Gwiazdowo
- Village
- Location within Poland
- Coordinates: 53°41′20″N 16°17′37″E
- Country: Poland
- Voivodeship: West Pomeranian
- County: Szczecinek
- Gmina: Barwice

Gwiazdowo [ɡvʲazˈdɔvɔ] is a village in the administrative district of Gmina Barwice, within Szczecinek County, West Pomeranian Voivodeship, in north-western Poland.

For the history of the region, see History of Pomerania.
