= Wiele, Kuyavian-Pomeranian Voivodeship =

Wiele
- Village
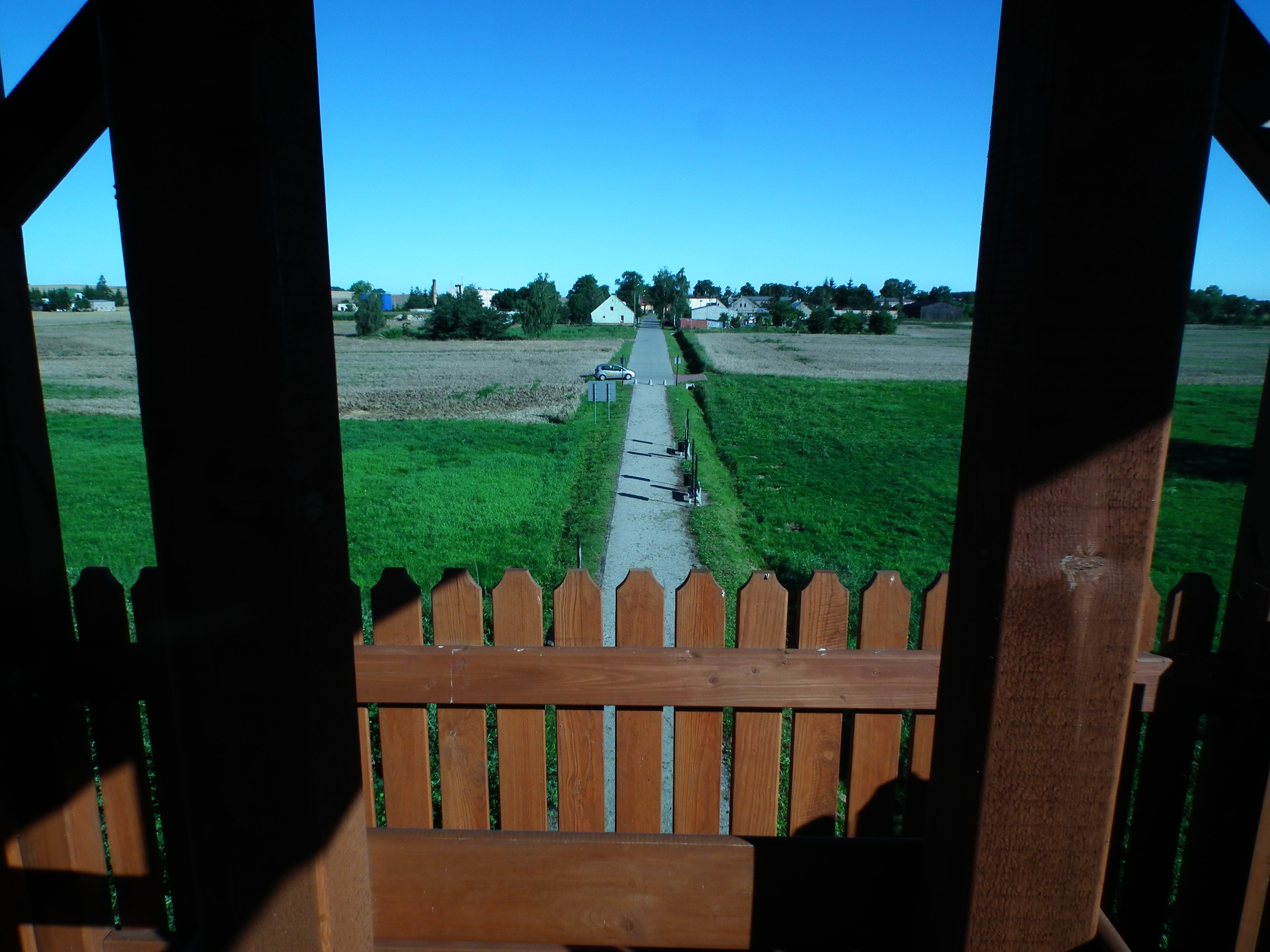

- Location within Poland
- Coordinates: 53°16′36″N 17°33′33″E
- Country: Poland
- Voivodeship: Pomeranian
- County: Nakło
- Gmina: Mrocza
- Population: 370

Wiele [ˈvjɛlɛ] is a village in the administrative district of Gmina Karsin, within Kościerzyna County, Pomeranian Voivodeship, in north-central Poland.
