= Hvězdoňovice =

- Municipality
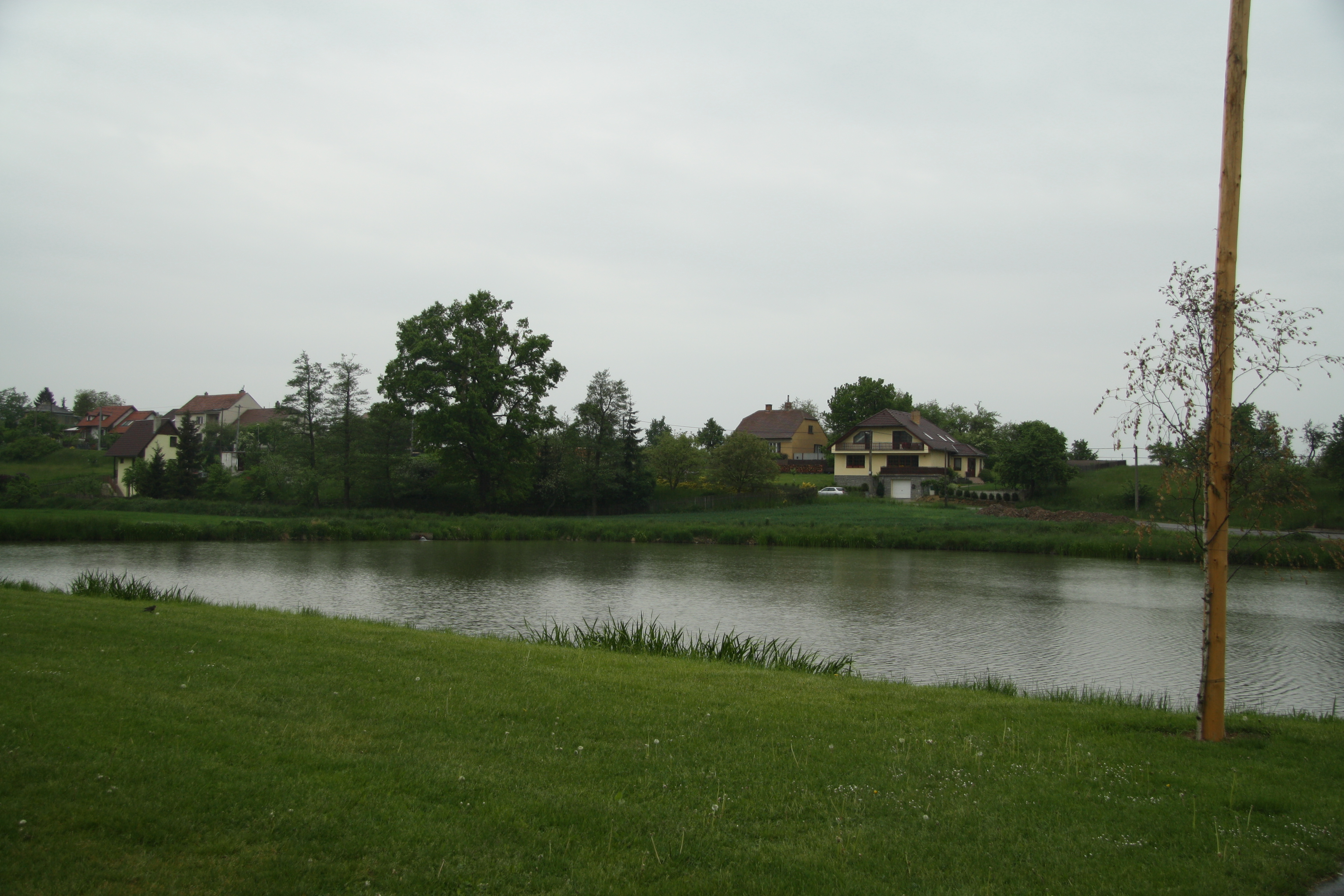
- Fishpond in the centre of Hvězdoňovice

- Location in the Czech Republic
- Coordinates: 49°13′12″N 15°45′44″E
- Country: Czech Republic
- Region: Vysočina
- District: Třebíč
- First mentioned: 1371

Area
  - Total: 2.60 km^{2} (1.00 sq mi)
- Elevation: 551 m (1,808 ft)

Population (2026-01-01)
  - Total: 109
  - Density: 41.9/km^{2} (109/sq mi)
- Time zone: UTC+1 (CET)
  - Summer (DST): UTC+2 (CEST)
- Postal code: 675 21
- Website: www.hvezdonovice.cz

Hvězdoňovice is a municipality and village in Třebíč District in the Vysočina Region of the Czech Republic. It has about 100 inhabitants.

Hvězdoňovice lies approximately 9 kilometres (6 mi) west of Třebíč, 24 km (15 mi) south-east of Jihlava, and 137 km (85 mi) south-east of Prague.

== Demographics ==
Historical population
Year	Pop.	±%
1869	198	—
1880	178	−10.1%
1890	173	−2.8%
1900	184	+6.4%
1910	163	−11.4%
1921	155	−4.9%
1930	148	−4.5%
1950	94	−36.5%
1961	117	+24.5%
1970	110	−6.0%
1980	99	−10.0%
1991	91	−8.1%
2001	89	−2.2%
2011	93	+4.5%
2021	108	+16.1%
Source: Censuses
