= Gmina Barwice =

Gmina Barwice Barwice Commune
- Gmina
- Flag Coat of arms
- Interactive map of Gmina Barwice
- Coordinates (Barwice): 53°44′N 16°21′E
- Country: Poland
- Voivodeship: West Pomeranian
- County: Szczecinek
- Seat: Barwice

Area
  - Total: 258.89 km^{2} (99.96 sq mi)

Population (2006)
  - Total: 8,897
  - Density: 34.37/km^{2} (89.01/sq mi)
  - Urban: 3,838
  - Rural: 5,059
- Website: http://www.barwice.pl/

Gmina Barwice is an urban-rural gmina (administrative district) in Szczecinek County, West Pomeranian Voivodeship, in north-western Poland. Its seat is the town of Barwice, which lies approximately 23 kilometres (14 mi) west of Szczecinek and 122 km (76 mi) east of the regional capital Szczecin.

The gmina covers an area of 258.89 square kilometres (100.0 sq mi), and as of 2006 its total population is 8,897, of which the population of Barwice is 3,838, and the population of the rural part of the gmina is 5,059.

The gmina contains part of the protected area called Drawsko Landscape Park.

== Villages ==
Apart from the town of Barwice, Gmina Barwice contains the villages and settlements of Bącki, Białowąs, Borzęcino, Brzeźno, Chłopówko, Chłopowo, Chwalimka, Chwalimki, Cybulino, Dobrzycko, Gąski, Gonne Małe, Górki, Grabiążek, Gwiazdowo, Jadwigowo, Jagielnik, Jeziorki, Kaźmierzewo, Kłodzino, Knyki, Kobacz, Kobuz, Kołątek, Kolonia Łęknica, Kolonia Przybkowo, Kolonia Sulikowo, Koprzywienko, Koprzywno, Korzec, Krzyka, Krzywolas, Łęknica, Liwiec, Luboradza, Lubostronie, Niemierzyno, Nowa Łęknica, Nowe Koprzywno, Nowy Chwalim, Nowy Grabiąż, Ostropole, Ostrowąsy, Parchlino, Piaski, Polne, Przybkówko, Smaga, Śmilcz, Stare Koprzywno, Stary Chwalim, Stary Grabiąż, Sulikowo, Świerk, Tarmno, Trzemienko, Uradz, Weje, Wojsławiec, Żdżar and Żytnik.

== Neighbouring gminas ==
Gmina Barwice is bordered by the gminas of Borne Sulinowo, Czaplinek, Grzmiąca, Połczyn-Zdrój, Szczecinek and Tychowo.
