= Barwice =

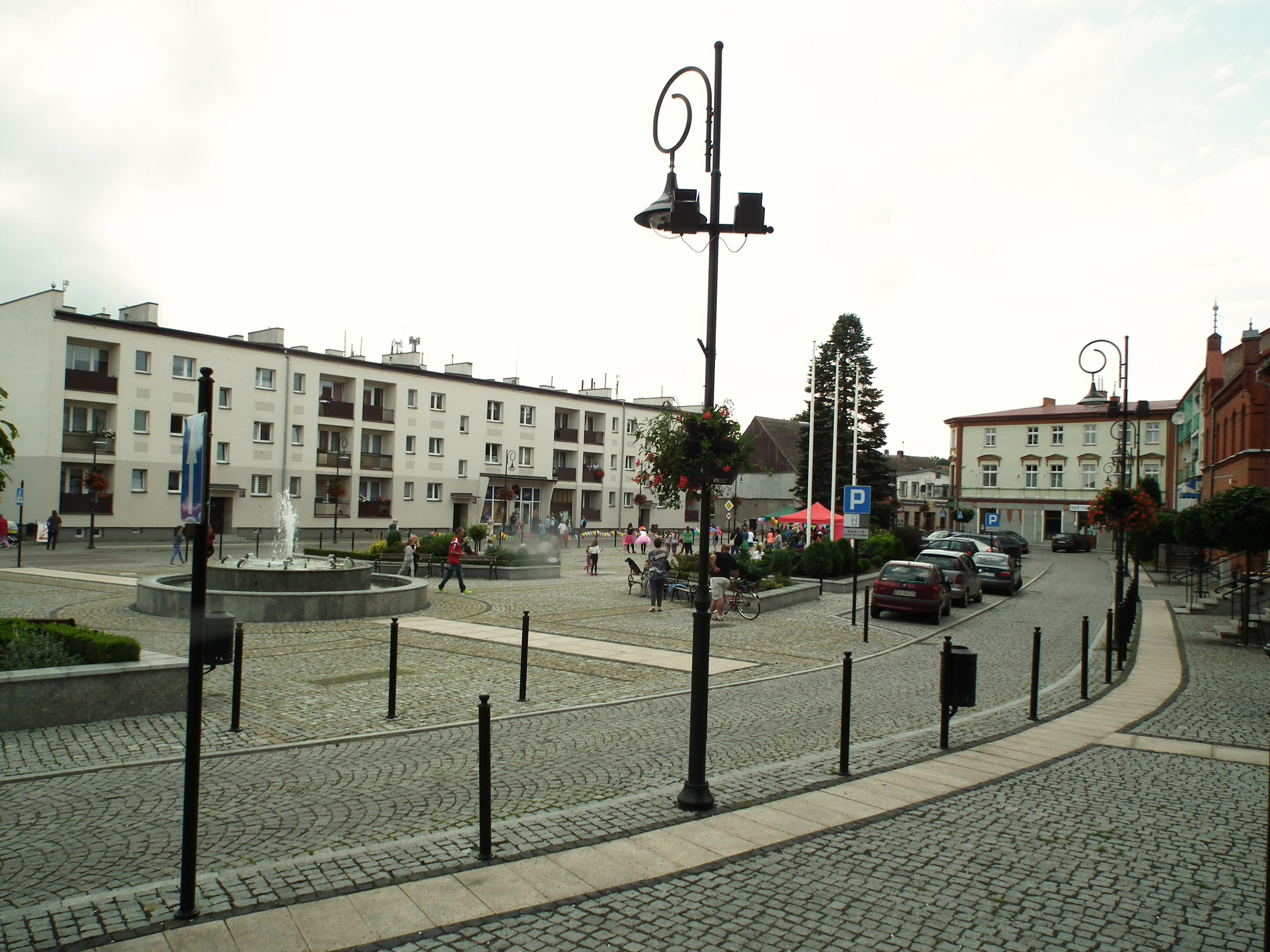
- Market Square (Rynek)

- Flag Coat of arms

- Location within Poland
- Coordinates: 53°44′N 16°21′E
- Country: Poland
- Voivodeship: West Pomeranian
- County: Szczecinek
- Gmina: Barwice

Government
  - Mayor: Mariusz Kieling

Area
  - Total: 7.52 km^{2} (2.90 sq mi)

Population (31 December 2021)
  - Total: 3,627
  - Density: 482/km^{2} (1,250/sq mi)
- Time zone: UTC+1 (CET)
  - Summer (DST): UTC+2 (CEST)
- Postal code: 78-460
- Area code: +48 94
- Car plates: ZSZ
- Website: http://www.barwice.pl

Barwice [barˈvʲit͡sɛ] (German: Bärwalde) is a town in north-western Poland, in West Pomeranian Voivodship, in Szczecinek County. It is the seat of Gmina Barwice. As of December 2021, the town has a population of 3,627.

== Geography ==
The town is located on the Baltic Uplands in Farther Pomerania at an altitude of about 150 to 180 meters above sea level within the upper region of the river Parsęta. 20 kilometers further south the Drawsko Pomorskie begins. The next larger city is Szczecinek.

== History ==
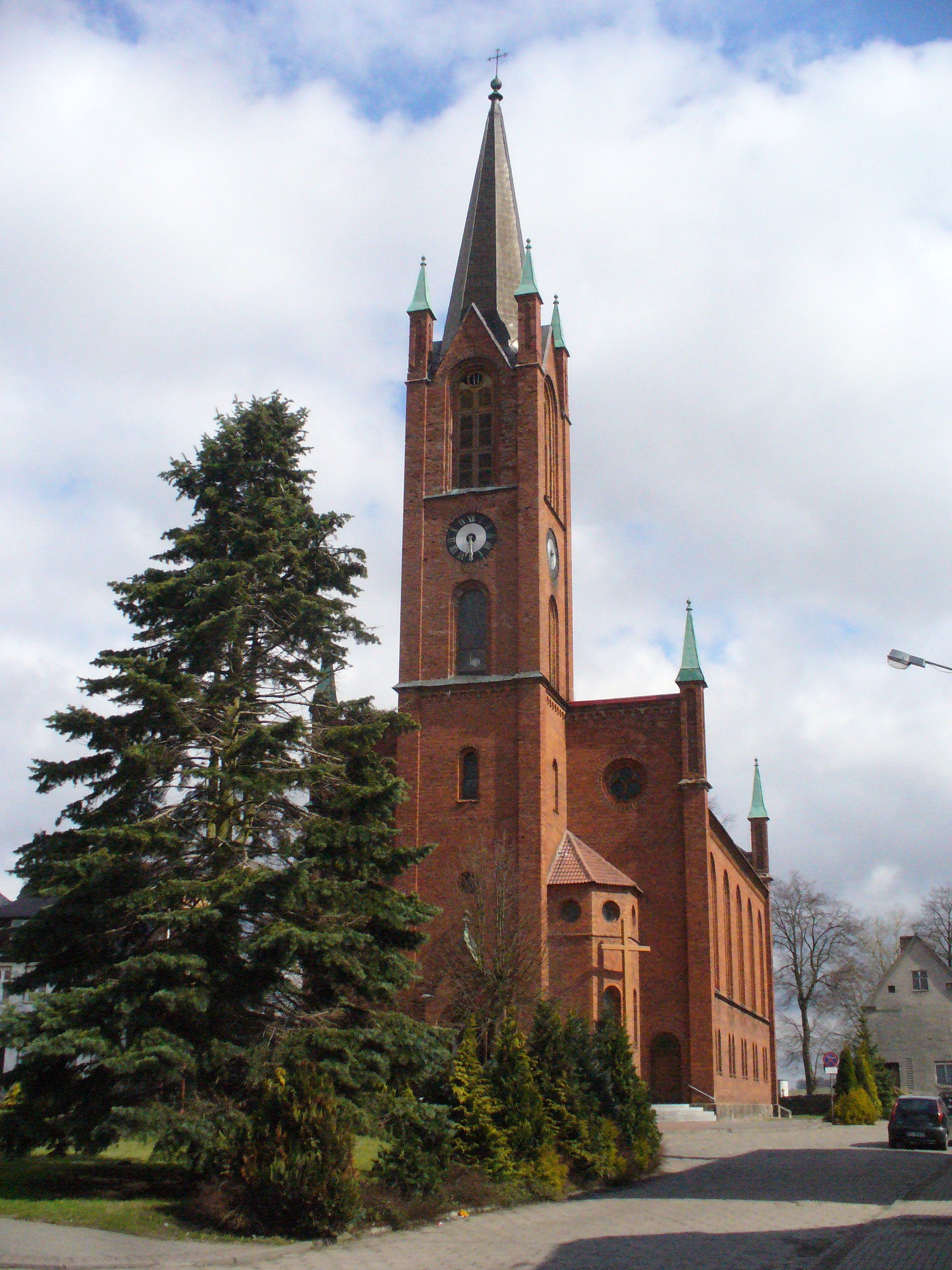
Saint Stephen church

The settlement is first mentioned as civitas Barwitz in historical records from 1286, when it was granted by Polish Duke Przemysł II to the Knights Templar, but since it is located in the vicinity of a pre-historical salt road leading to the saltworks of Kołobrzeg, it probably had been founded much earlier.

The town and its neighbouring villages became in 1477 under duke Bogislaw X part of the Duchy of Pomerania. In the 16th century the town and the surrounding lands were in the possession of four noble families: von Glasenapp, von Wolde, von Zastrow and von Münchow. The oldest town seal is from 1564 and carries the inscription Sigillum civitatis Berwoldie. During the second half of the 16th century, duke John Frederick granted to the town the right to hold trade fairs three times a year.

In 1626 a blaze destroyed parts of the town, including both the town hall and the church. Because of this, the town was freed from tax paying for the next five years. During the Thirty Years' War the town was occupied in 1630 by Swedish military of Gustav II Adolph and suffered heavy damages. During the Seven Years' War Russian troops devastated the town's archives within the town hall, so that all older historical documents went lost.

In the 18th century the town became part of the Kingdom of Prussia, and from 1871 to 1945 it was part of Germany. Since 1766 five fairs per year were allowed to be arranged. In the 18th century, immigrants from France founded a tobacco factory in the town.

Before World War II it had been the site of a county court and of a customs office, and it had a secondary school. The local industry manufactured machinery and produced building materials made from sandstone. There existed both sawmills and grain mills. The town was a centre of agricultural trade, the main trade products being grain, potatoes and cattle. During World War II, the Germans operated a labor camp for French and Belgian prisoners of war from the Stalag II-B prisoner-of-war camp in the town.

In March 1945, shortly before the end of World War II, the town was captured by the Soviet Army. Under the terms of the Potsdam Agreement, the town became again part of Poland after the war.

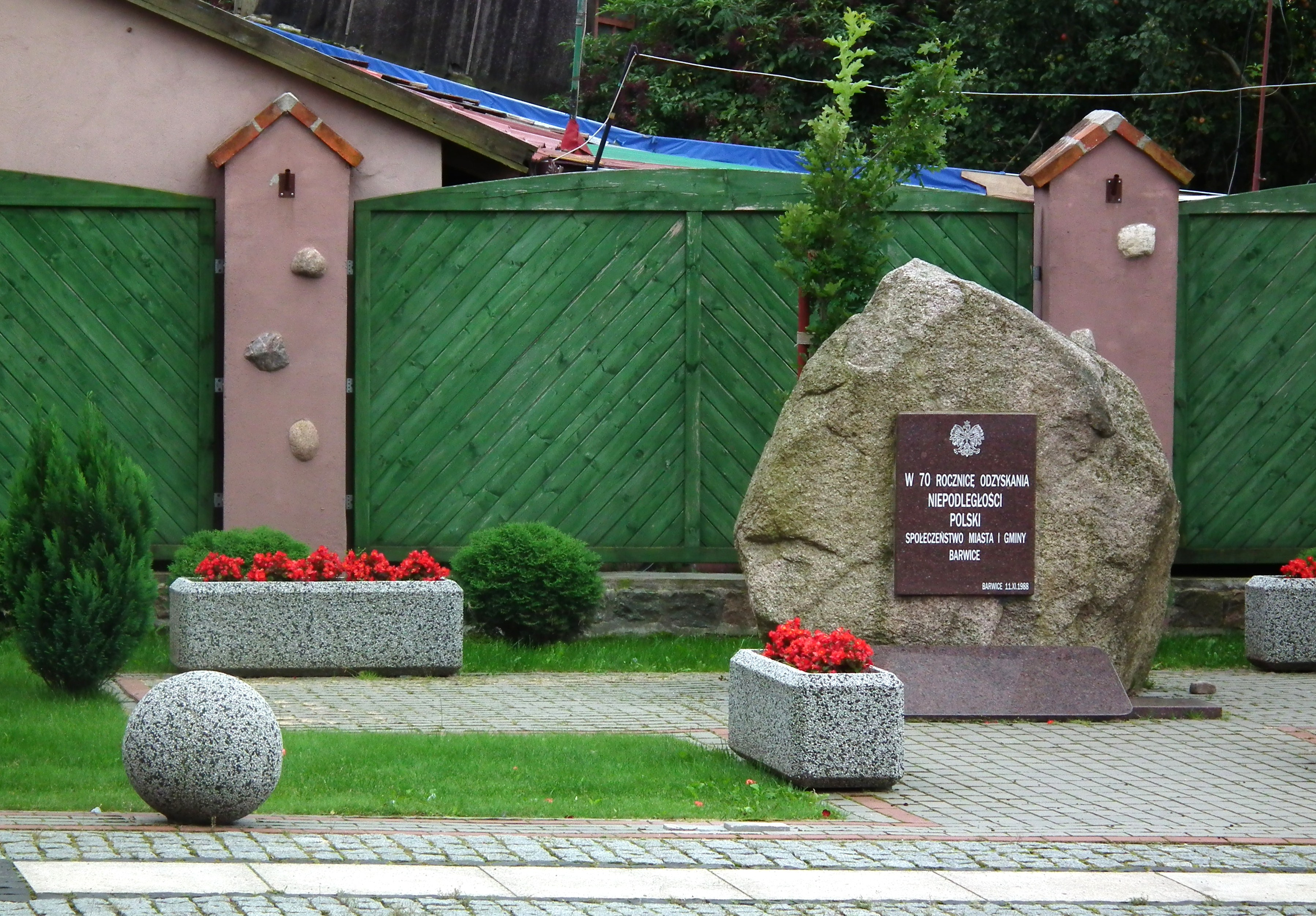
A memorial stone from 1988, erected on the 70th anniversary of Poland regaining its independence

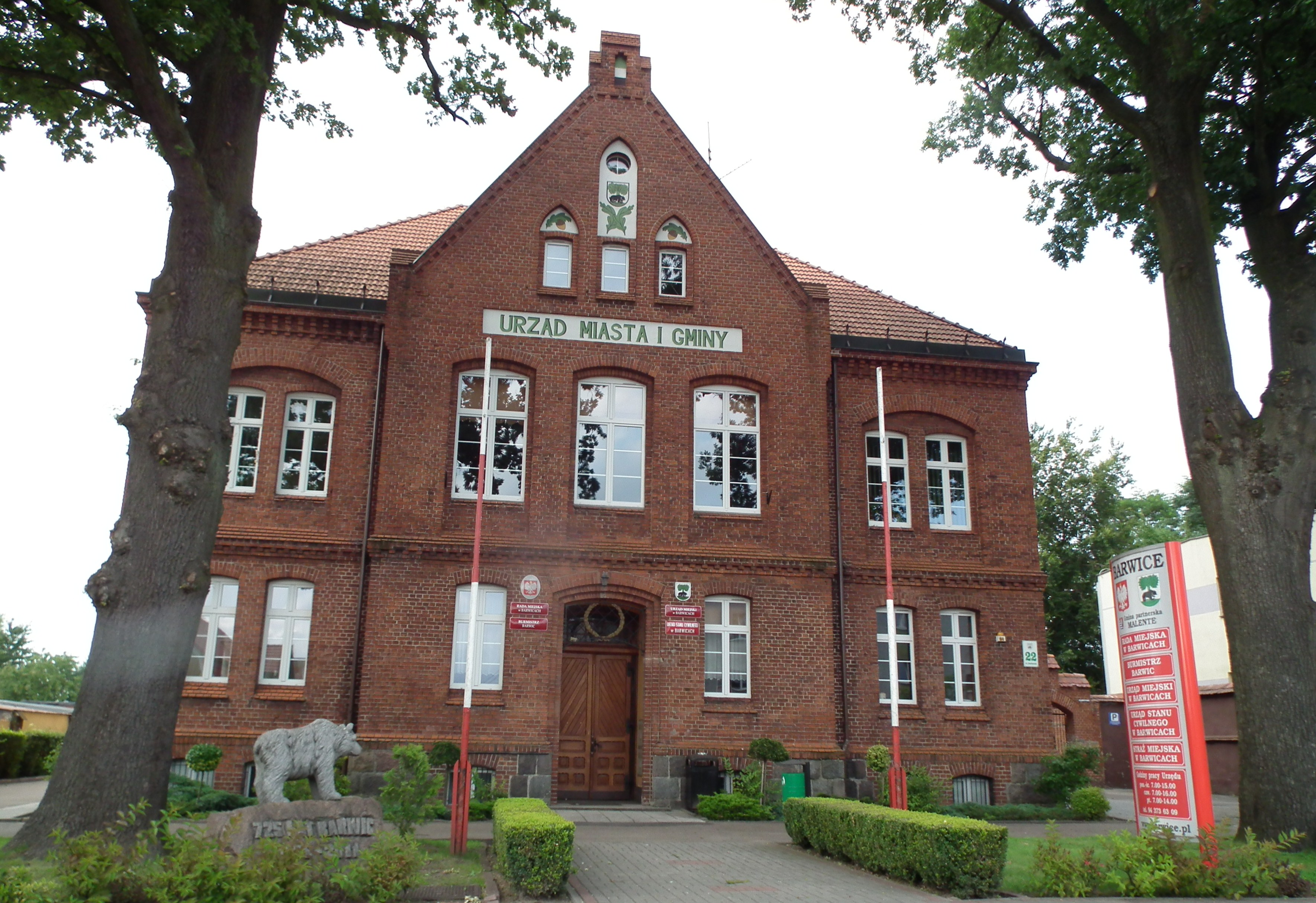
Municipal office

== Demographics ==
Number of inhabitants by year

- 1740: 472
- 1783: 533; incl. 6 Jews.
- 1794: 663; incl. 7 Jews.
- 1812: 804; incl. 6 Catholics and 34 Jews.
- 1816: 854; incl. 5 Catholics and 59 Jews.
- 1831: 1,180; incl. 6 Catholics and 85 Jews.
- 1843: 1,571; incl. 3 Catholics and 129 Jews.
- 1852: 1,741; incl. 4 Catholics and 143 Jews.
- 1861: 1,964; incl. 8 Catholics and 180 Jews.
- 1900: 2,338
- 1925: 2,530
- 2004: 3,876
- 2021: 3,627

== Transport ==
Voivodeship roads nr. 171 and 172 pass through the town.

Since 1999 the railway between Grzmiąca and Kostrzyn has been closed down, hence a rail connection to Barwice no longer exists.

== Sports ==
The local football team is Błonie Barwice, founded in 1952. It competes in the regional lower leagues.

== Notable people ==
- Angelika Waller (born 1944), an East German actress.
