= Ponikve =

Ponikve, which translates as "sinkholes" from Serbo-Croatian, may refer to:

== Bosnia and Herzegovina ==
- Ponikve, Čajniče, a settlement in the Municipality of Čajniče

== Croatia ==
- Ponikve, alternate name of Punikve near Ivanec, Varaždin County
- Ponikve, Karlovac County, a village and karst polje near Ogulin, Karlovac County
- Ponikve, Bakar, a village and karst polje near Bakar, Primorje-Gorski Kotar County
- Ponikve, Pelješac, a group of villages and karst polje on Pelješac, Dubrovnik-Neretva County
- Ponikve, Tršće, a hamlet and group of dolines near Tršće, Primorje-Gorski Kotar County
- Ponikve, Forčići, a karst polje near Forčići, Istria County
- Ponikve, Krk, a karst polje on Krk, Primorje-Gorski Kotar County
- Ponikve, Studena, a karst polje near Studena, Istria County
- Ponikve, Zagreb, a karst polje on Medvednica, in Zagreb County

=== Dolines ===
- Ponikve, Gerovo, a group of dolines on the Gerovo polje, in Primorje-Gorski Kotar County
- Ponikve, Samobor, a group of dolines on Samoborsko gorje, in Zagreb County
- Ponikve, Barilović, a group of dolines near Barilović, Karlovac County
- Ponikve, Kostanje, a group of two dolines in Kostanje, Split-Dalmatia County
- Ponikve, Kučevice, a group of dolines near Kučevice, Karlovac County
- Ponikve, Lokve, a group of dolines near Lokve, Primorje-Gorski Kotar County
- Ponikve, Mikulov vrh, a group of dolines near Leskova Draga, Primorje-Gorski Kotar County
- Ponikve, Mošun, a group of dolines near Hrib, Primorje-Gorski Kotar County
- Ponikve, Olib, a group of dolines near Olib, Zadar County
- Ponikve, Pengari, a group of dolines near Buzet, Istria County
- Ponikve, Molat, a field near Zapuntel, Zadar County
- Ponikve, Prapoće, a field near Prapoće, Istria County

=== Sport ===
- NK Ponikve, a Croatian soccer club based in Zagreb

== Serbia ==
- Ponikve, Golubac
- Ponikve Airport, an airport near Užice

== Slovenia ==
- Ponikve, Brežice, a settlement in the Municipality of Brežice
- Ponikve, Cerknica, a settlement in the Municipality of Cerknica
- Ponikve, Dobrepolje, a settlement in the Municipality of Dobrepolje
- Ponikve, Sežana, a settlement in the Municipality of Sežana
- Ponikve, Tolmin, a settlement in the Municipality of Tolmin
- Ponikve pri Studencu, a settlement in the Municipality of Sevnica
- Ponikve, Semič, a former settlement in the Municipality of Semič

== Geology ==
- The plural form of a Slovene and Serbo-Croatian term for sinkhole, sometimes used in English

== See also ==
- Ponikva (disambiguation)
