= Dyminek =

- Village
- Location within Poland
- Coordinates: 53°46′42″N 16°52′35″E
- Country: Poland
- Voivodeship: West Pomeranian
- County: Szczecinek
- Gmina: Biały Bór
- Population: 80

Dyminek [dɨˈminɛk] is a village in the administrative district of Gmina Biały Bór, within Szczecinek County, West Pomeranian Voivodeship, in north-western Poland. It lies approximately 14 km (9 mi) south of Biały Bór, 15 km (9 mi) north-east of Szczecinek, and 157 km (98 mi) east of the regional capital Szczecin.

For the history of the region, see History of Pomerania.

The village has a population of 80.
