= Rzyszczewko, Szczecinek County =

Rzyszczewko
- Settlement
- Location within Poland
- Coordinates: 53°58′34″N 16°51′23″E
- Country: Poland
- Voivodeship: West Pomeranian
- County: Szczecinek
- Gmina: Biały Bór
- Population: 10

Rzyszczewko [ʐɨʂˈt͡ʂɛfkɔ] is a settlement in the administrative district of Gmina Biały Bór, within Szczecinek County, West Pomeranian Voivodeship, in north-western Poland. It lies approximately 9 km (6 mi) north of Biały Bór, 31 km (19 mi) north of Szczecinek, and 163 km (101 mi) north-east of the regional capital Szczecin.

For the history of the region, see History of Pomerania.

The settlement has a population of 10.
