= Ponikwa =

Ponikwa may refer to the following places:

- Ponikwa, Lower Silesian Voivodeship — a village in south-west Poland.
- Ponikwa, Masovian Voivodeship — a village in east-central Poland.
- Ponikwa, West Pomeranian Voivodeship — a village in north-west Poland.
- Ponikwa, now spelled Ponykva — a village in West Ukraine.

== See also ==
- Ponikva (disambiguation)
