= Biskupice-Kolonia, West Pomeranian Voivodeship =

Biskupice-Kolonia
- Settlement
- Location within Poland
- Coordinates: 53°51′30″N 16°47′29″E
- Country: Poland
- Voivodeship: West Pomeranian
- County: Szczecinek
- Gmina: Biały Bór

Biskupice-Kolonia [biskuˈpit͡sɛ kɔˈlɔɲa] is a settlement in the administrative district of Gmina Biały Bór, within Szczecinek County, West Pomeranian Voivodeship, in north-western Poland. It lies approximately 6 km (4 mi) south-west of Biały Bór, 18 km (11 mi) north-east of Szczecinek, and 154 km (96 mi) east of the regional capital Szczecin.

For the history of the region, see History of Pomerania.
