= Cybulin, West Pomeranian Voivodeship =

Cybulin
- Settlement
- Location within Poland
- Coordinates: 53°58′43″N 16°47′8″E
- Country: Poland
- Voivodeship: West Pomeranian
- County: Szczecinek
- Gmina: Biały Bór
- Population: 20

Cybulin [t͡sɨˈbulin] is a settlement in the administrative district of Gmina Biały Bór, within Szczecinek County, West Pomeranian Voivodeship, in north-western Poland. It lies approximately 10 km (6 mi) north of Biały Bór, 30 km (19 mi) north of Szczecinek, and 158 km (98 mi) north-east of the regional capital Szczecin.

For the history of the region, see History of Pomerania.

The settlement has a population of 20.
