= Kazimierz, West Pomeranian Voivodeship =

Kazimierz
- Village
- Location within Poland
- Coordinates: 53°51′48″N 16°45′7″E
- Country: Poland
- Voivodeship: West Pomeranian
- County: Szczecinek
- Gmina: Biały Bór
- Population: 60

Kazimierz (Polish pronunciation: [kaˈʑimjɛʂ]) is a village in the administrative district of Gmina Biały Bór, within Szczecinek County, West Pomeranian Voivodeship, in north-western Poland. It lies approximately 7 km (4 mi) south-west of Biały Bór, 17 km (11 mi) north of Szczecinek, and 152 km (94 mi) east of the regional capital Szczecin.

For the history of the region, see History of Pomerania.

The village has a population of 60.
