= Przybrda =

- Village
- Location within Poland
- Coordinates: 53°49′44″N 16°50′22″E
- Country: Poland
- Voivodeship: West Pomeranian
- County: Szczecinek
- Gmina: Biały Bór
- Population: 400

Przybrda [ˈpʂɨbrda] is a village in the administrative district of Gmina Biały Bór, within Szczecinek County, West Pomeranian Voivodeship, in north-western Poland. It lies approximately 8 km (5 mi) south of Biały Bór, 17 km (11 mi) north-east of Szczecinek, and 156 km (97 mi) east of the regional capital Szczecin.

For the history of the region, see History of Pomerania.

The village has a population of 400.
