= Bielica, West Pomeranian Voivodeship =

Village in Poland

Bielica
- Village
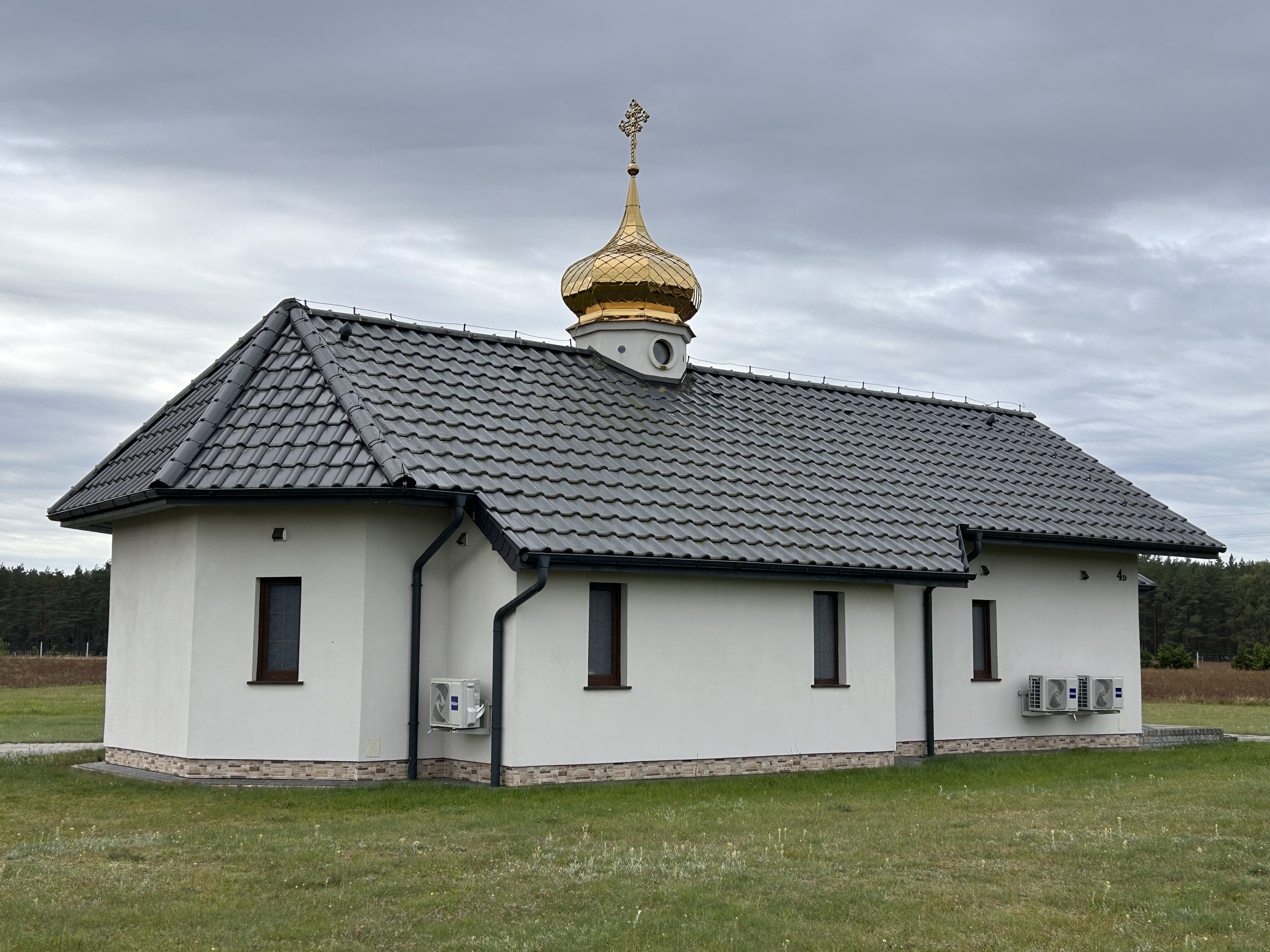
- An Eastern Catholic church in the village

- Location within Poland
- Coordinates: 53°47′2″N 16°55′11″E
- Country: Poland
- Voivodeship: West Pomeranian
- County: Szczecinek
- Gmina: Biały Bór
- Population: 140

Bielica [bjɛˈlit͡sa] is a village in the administrative district of Gmina Biały Bór, within Szczecinek County, West Pomeranian Voivodeship, in north-western Poland. It lies approximately 14 km (9 mi) south-east of Biały Bór, 18 km (11 mi) north-east of Szczecinek, and 160 km (99 mi) east of the regional capital Szczecin.

For the history of the region, see History of Pomerania.

The village has a population of 140.
