= Jawory, Szczecinek County =

Jawory
- Settlement
- Location within Poland
- Coordinates: 53°53′5″N 16°54′43″E
- Country: Poland
- Voivodeship: West Pomeranian
- County: Szczecinek
- Gmina: Biały Bór
- Population: 10

Jawory [jaˈvɔrɨ] is a settlement in the administrative district of Gmina Biały Bór, within Szczecinek County, West Pomeranian Voivodeship, in north-western Poland. It lies approximately 6 km (4 mi) east of Biały Bór, 24 km (15 mi) north-east of Szczecinek, and 163 km (101 mi) east of the regional capital Szczecin.

For the history of the region, see History of Pomerania.

The settlement has a population of 10.
