= Kierzkowo, Szczecinek County =

Kierzkowo
- Settlement
- Location within Poland
- Coordinates: 53°58′4″N 16°52′21″E
- Country: Poland
- Voivodeship: West Pomeranian
- County: Szczecinek
- Gmina: Biały Bór
- Population: 20

Kierzkowo (Polish pronunciation: [kʲɛʂˈkɔvɔ]) is a settlement in the administrative district of Gmina Biały Bór, within Szczecinek County, West Pomeranian Voivodeship, in north-western Poland. It lies approximately 9 km (6 mi) north of Biały Bór, 31 km (19 mi) north-east of Szczecinek, and 163 km (101 mi) east of the regional capital Szczecin. The settlement has a population of 20.
