= Ponikve, Tolmin =

Ponikve
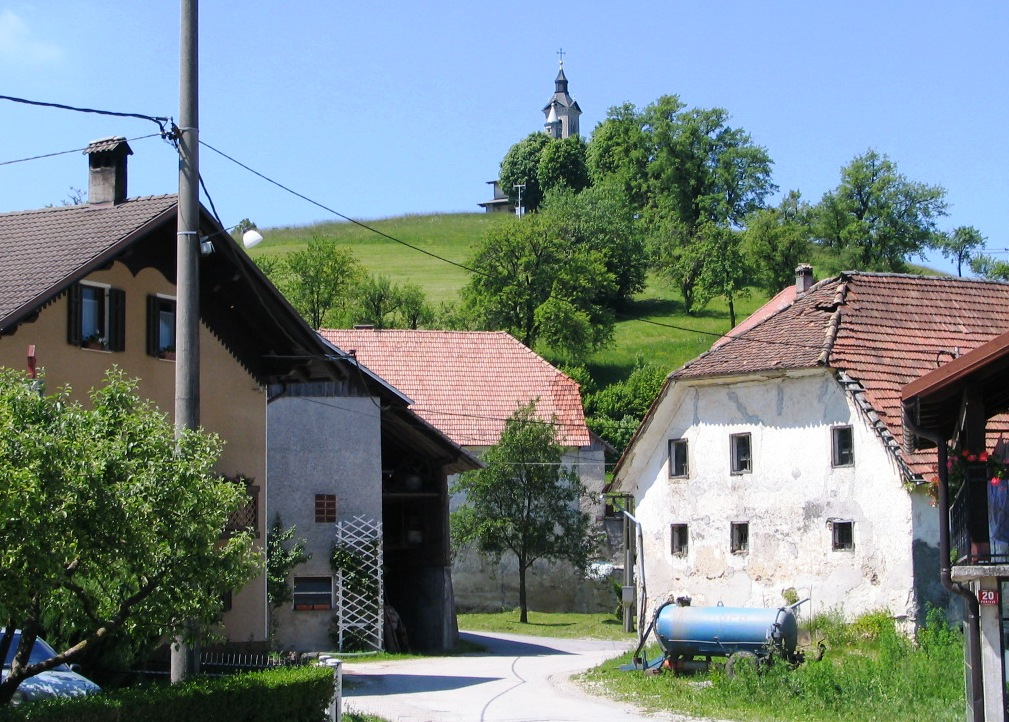
- The village of Ponikve with Visitation Church in the background

- Location in Slovenia
- Coordinates: 46°8′15.95″N 13°49′0.32″E
- Country: Slovenia
- Traditional region: Slovenian Littoral
- Statistical region: Gorizia
- Municipality: Tolmin

Area
  - Total: 7.86 km^{2} (3.03 sq mi)
- Elevation: 673.9 m (2,211 ft)

Population (2012)
  - Total: 181
  - Density: 23/km^{2} (60/sq mi)

Ponikve (pronounced [pɔˈniːkʋɛ]) is a clustered settlement in the Municipality of Tolmin in the Littoral region of Slovenia.

== Geography ==
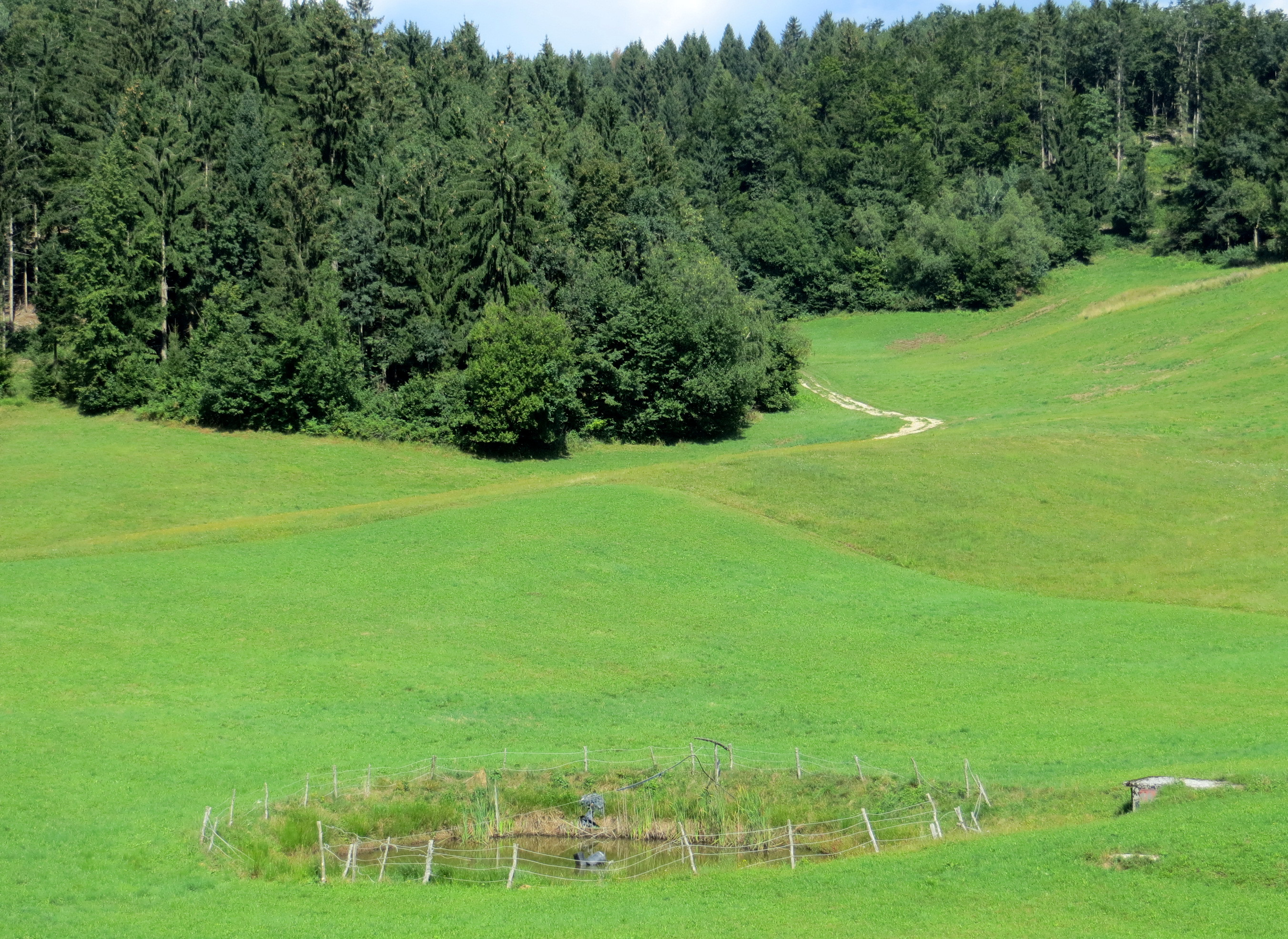
Pond at Na Kalih

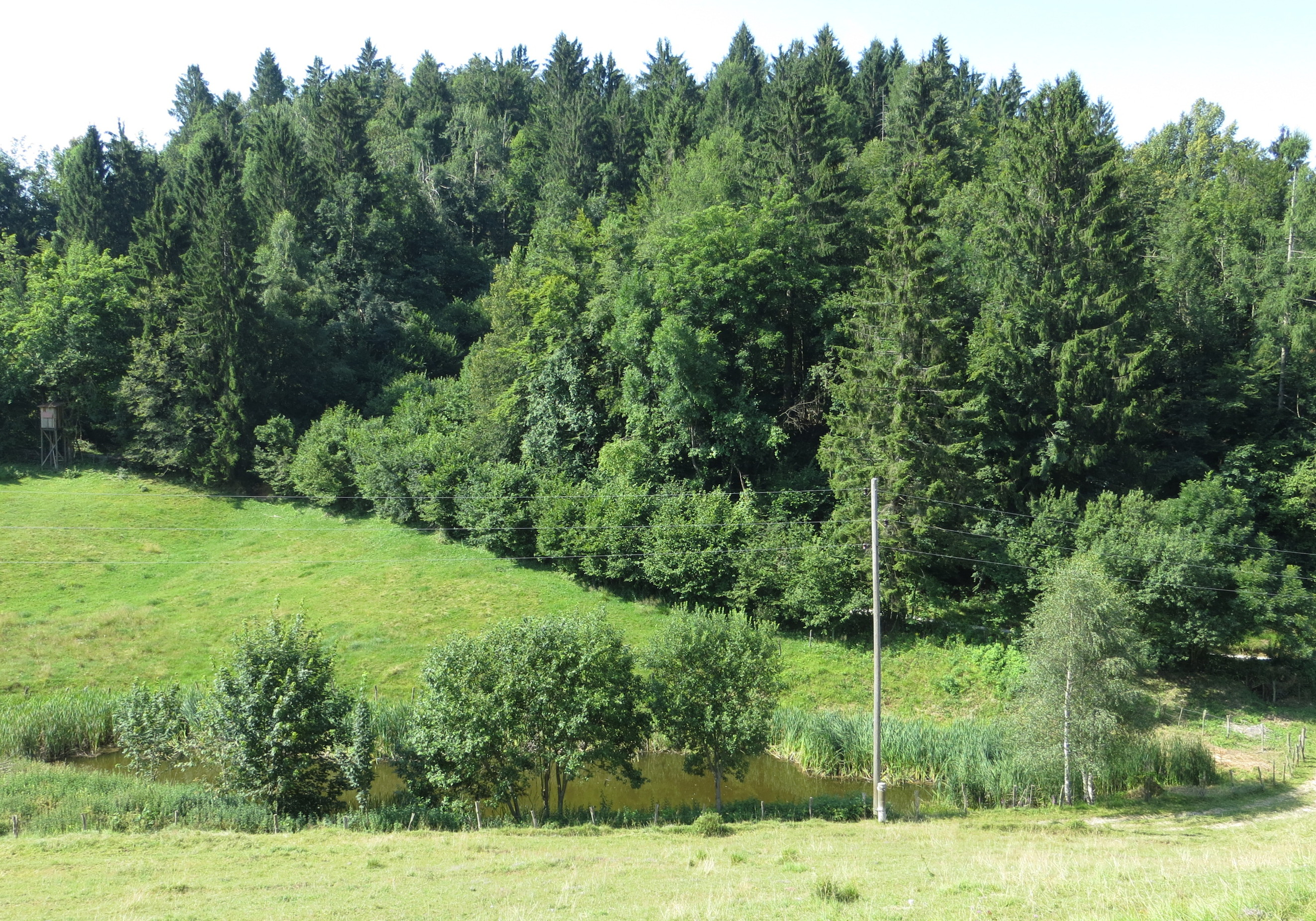
Grahel Pond

Ponds in Ponikve

Ponikve is located on the western part of the St. Vitus Plateau (Slovene: Šentviška planota) or Šentviška Gora Plateau (Šentviškogorska planota) south of the Bača Ravine (Baška grapa). It lies on the road from Idrija pri Bači to Pečine to Slap ob Idrijci. Ponikve includes the hamlets and isolated farms of Lazi, Ostrožnik, Penček, Pri Puhu, Rob, Rute, V Grapi, Zagomilca, Zapušnik, and Za Vrhom. The village core lies in a basin surrounded by the following hills: Oblačno Brdo (755 meters or 2,477 feet), Pušnik (841 meters or 2,759 feet), Zadnik (713 meters or 2,339 feet), Gasilca (747 meters or 2,451 feet), Križ (723 meters or 2,372 feet), and Lepa Gorica (738 meters or 2,421 feet). Penček Hill (Slovene: Penčkov grič, 912 meters or 2,992 feet) stands to the east, north of Penček. Intermittent Lake Rupa (surface area 0.12 ha, max. depth 2 m) lies north of the village. The lake is the source of an intermittent influent stream that disappears into a gorge at the end of the village, probably reemerging at Kresnica Cave above the hamlet of Potoka near Slap ob Idrijci. In the eastern part of the village there is a small pond at Na Kalih northeast of Zagomilca, and Grahel Pond (Slovene: Grahelnova mlaka) lies on the extreme eastern edge of the village near Penček.

== Name ==
The name Ponikve is a plural form derived from the word ponikva 'influent stream' or 'sinkhole' (into which such a stream disappears). In its plural form it refers to a gently rolling landscape consisting of the basins of an influent stream. Like other villages named Ponikve and similar names (e.g., Ponikva), it refers to a local landscape element.

== History ==
The village of Ponikve was burned on 26 July 1907 in a fire caused by a lightning strike. A fire department was established in Ponikve in 1947, and a station was built for it in 1957. In 1974 the department was expanded to serve the entire Šentviška Gora Plateau. A new fire station was built in 1980, following the earthquake of 1976.

== Architecture ==
The typical houses are two-story steep-roofed buildings of the Cerkno type, some of which were still had thatched roofs in second half of the 20th century, with farm buildings standing behind them. The hayracks are the double type, known as the toplar.

== Visitation Church ==
Visitation Church

The parish church in the settlement stand on Križ Hill and is dedicated to the Visitation and belongs to the Koper Diocese. Three churches are known to have stood at this site. The original small Gothic church at this site is believed to date from the 1480s based on a stone plaque on the south side of the church bearing the inscription "maister Andre von Lach 148_" (the last digit is missing), referring to the prominent builder Andrej of Loka (a.k.a. Andreas von Lack).

In the 18th century, a new larger Baroque church was built at the site. At that time the altar and other church valuables were brought to this church from the already abandoned and dilapidated former St. Nicholas' Church, which stood on the hill north of the village. During the Second World War, the Partisans used the church as a stronghold. As a result, on 2 July 1944, on the Feast of the Annunciation, the church was burned by German troops, destroying everything except the altar statue and the shrine of the Holy Sepulchre, which the locals managed to save. The ruins were dynamited in March 1945, leaving only the damaged bell tower and walls.

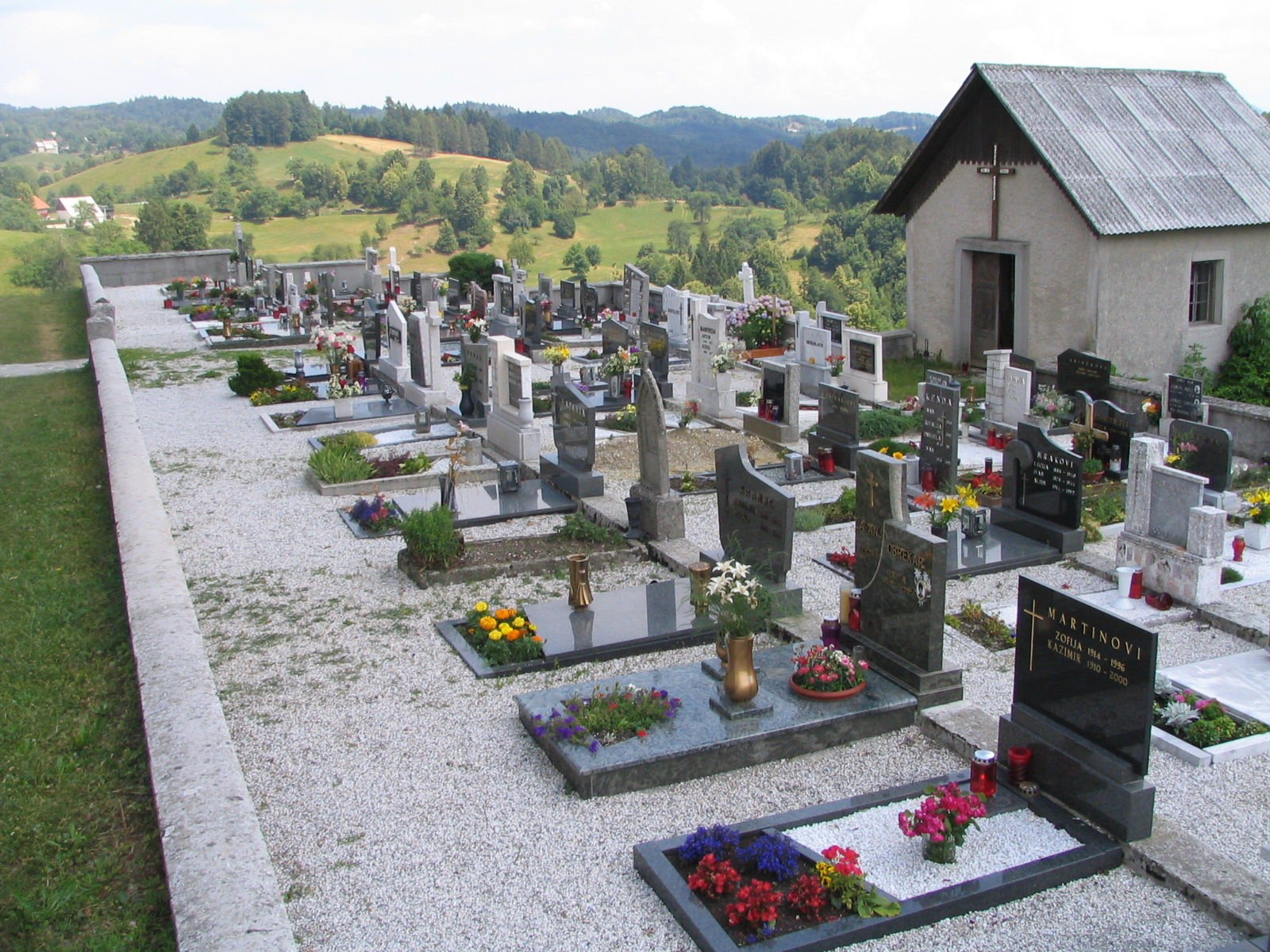
Ponikve village cemetery

In 1952, after considerable difficulty and thanks to the efforts of the parish priest Janez Lapanja, the architect Jože Plečnik agreed to rebuild the church. Work began in 1954, and this third structure was newly consecrated on 19 October 1958 by Archbishop Anton Vovk. In Plečnik's characteristic style, the reconstruction utilized elements of the old structure, including the bell tower. At the same time, the interior and exterior decoration departed radically from the former building, and the orientation of the church was reversed so that the nave is now on the east end, towards the village, and the altar on the west. The church has two bell towers: the old one and a new one on the east side that also contains the stairs to the choir loft. The altar is in the corner to the right and above it is a 2-meter sculpture of the Virgin Mary with the Infant Christ. It was carved from linden wood by the sculptor Jože Lapuh of Ljubljana. The altar, paving, and columns are the work of Stane Vodnik from Podutik near Ljubljana. The church also contains a chalice made of brass and tombac donated by Plečnik, and a silver chalice donated by Vovk.

A second church in the parish is dedicated to Saint Anne. This chapel was built in 1862 and was used for masses on weekdays and in the winter, when it was difficult to reach the parish church. It also served as a school in the 19th century, where the parish priest also served as a teacher. It was partially renovated between 1951 and 1953 and a sacristy was added to the structure.

== Other cultural heritage ==
In addition to Visitation Church, several other structures in Ponikve have protected cultural monument status:

- The straight-line housebarn (stegnjeni kmečki dom) at Ponikve no. 36, in the center of the village, dated from the first quarter of the 19th century. It contained a traditional chimneyless smoke kitchen, main room, and bedroom, with a vaulted cellar below the bedroom and a mow below the roof. This building was destroyed circa 2008 and replaced with a modern structure.
- The farm at Ponikve nos. 88 and 89, east of the village, consists of a house and outbuildings, including a cellar and a double hayrack, arranged in a cluster. The farmhouse has a partially preserved smoke kitchen and the year 1876 is carved into the doorframe.
- The communal well in the center of the village, at Ponikve no. 20, dates from the 19th century. It has a carved stone rim and was declared a cultural monument on 14 June 1990.
- The roadside crucifix is a shrine in front of Ponikve no. 48. It dates from the last quarter of the 19th century. It is made entirely of wood and is protected by a roof that was formerly thatched.
- Traces of the layout and wall of the ruins of St. Nicholas' Church are still preserved. This church was mentioned in written sources between 1570 and 1668, and was abandoned during the reforms under Emperor Joseph II. The discovery of Roman artifacts in the village indicates that the site was of early importance.
- A Partisan Second World War memorial was erected in the center of the village on 14 November 1965. It consists of a plinth with a marble plaque and a column.

== Notable people ==
Notable people that were born or lived in Ponikve include:

- Jaka Hvala (born 1993), ski jumper
- Josip Kobal (pen names S. Radovanov, J. Zgodnjik) (1870–1888), poet
- Ivan Lapanja (1857–1945), surveyor and provincial delegate
- Vincenc "Cene" Lapanja (1886–1966), folk artist
- Janez Lapanja (1915–1979), folk artist

== Gallery ==
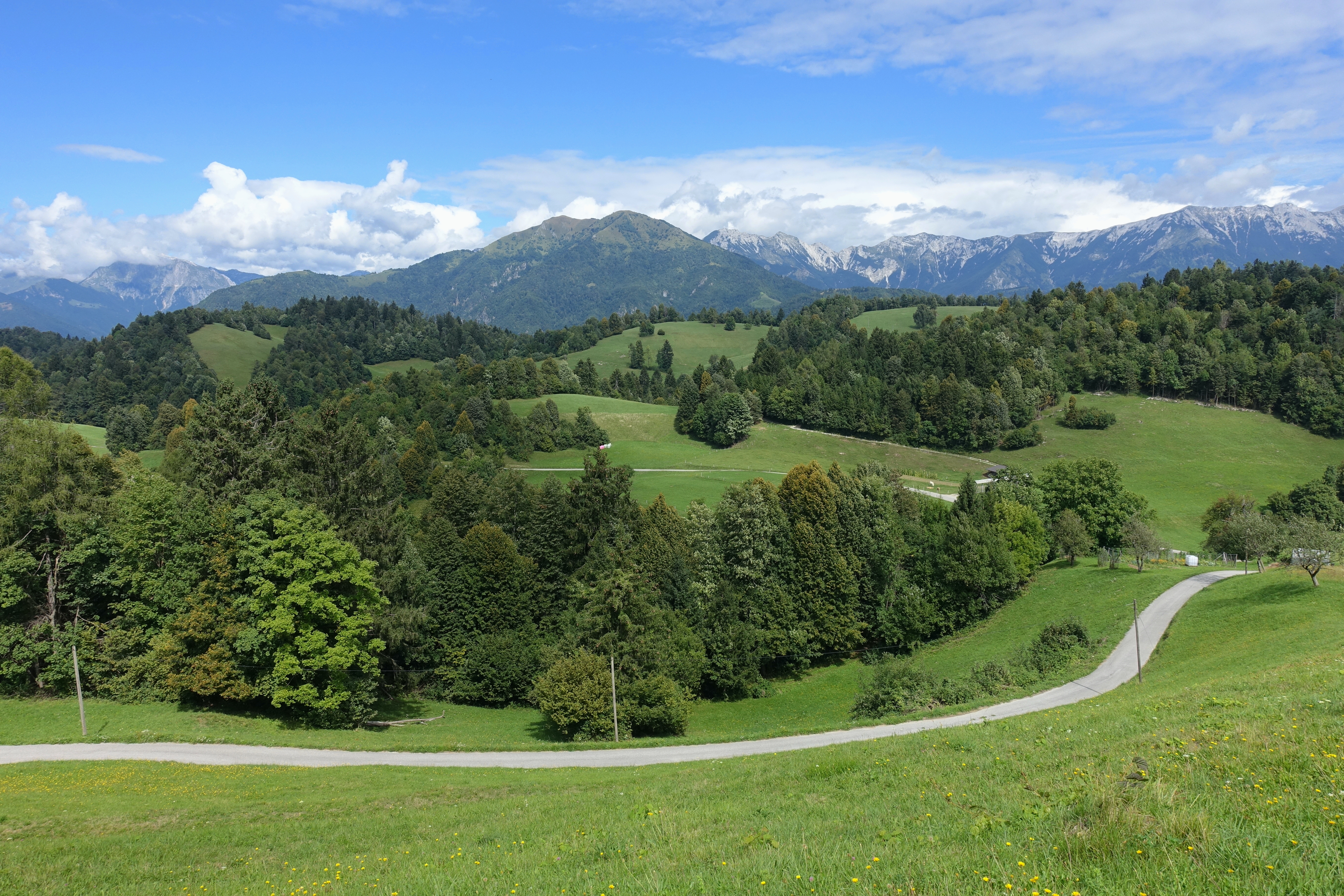
View of the Šentviška Gora Plateau in Ponikve
