= Świerszczewo, Szczecinek County =

Świerszczewo
- Village
- Location within Poland
- Coordinates: 53°49′5″N 16°48′44″E
- Country: Poland
- Voivodeship: West Pomeranian
- County: Szczecinek
- Gmina: Biały Bór
- Population: 170

Świerszczewo (Polish pronunciation: [ɕfjɛrʂˈt͡ʂɛvɔ]) is a village in the administrative district of Gmina Biały Bór, within Szczecinek County, West Pomeranian Voivodeship, in north-western Poland. It lies approximately 10 km (6 mi) south of Biały Bór, 15 km (9 mi) north-east of Szczecinek, and 154 km (96 mi) east of the regional capital Szczecin.

For the history of the region, see History of Pomerania.

The village has a population of 170.
