= Miłobądz, West Pomeranian Voivodeship =

Miłobądz
- Settlement
- Location within Poland
- Coordinates: 53°47′35″N 16°49′10″E
- Country: Poland
- Voivodeship: West Pomeranian
- County: Szczecinek
- Gmina: Biały Bór
- Population: 0

Miłobądz [miˈwɔbɔnt͡s] is a former settlement in the administrative district of Gmina Biały Bór, within Szczecinek County, West Pomeranian Voivodeship, in north-western Poland. It lies approximately 12 km (7 mi) south of Biały Bór, 13 km (8 mi) north-east of Szczecinek, and 154 km (96 mi) east of the regional capital Szczecin.

For the history of the region, see History of Pomerania.
