= Idrija (disambiguation) =

Idrija or Zgornja Idrija is a town in western Slovenia.

Idrija may also refer to:

- Idrija (river), a border river between Slovenia and Italy
- Idrija pri Bači, a village near Tolmin, Slovenia
- Spodnja Idrija, a village near the town of Idrija

== See also ==
- Idrija Fault, a seismically active fault in Slovenia
