= Dalkowo, West Pomeranian Voivodeship =

Dalkowo
- Settlement
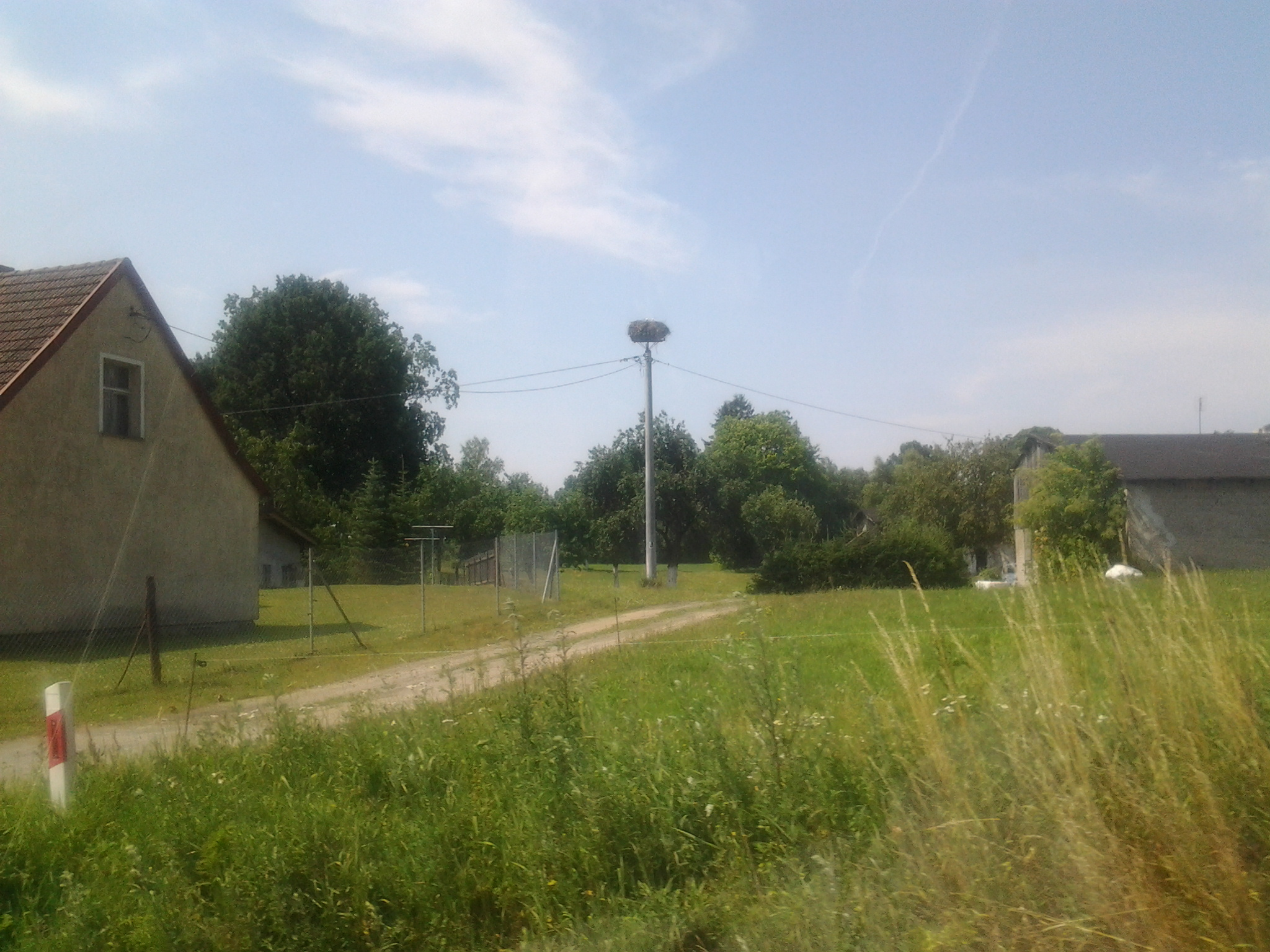

- Location within Poland
- Coordinates: 53°54′28″N 16°52′17″E
- Country: Poland
- Voivodeship: West Pomeranian
- County: Szczecinek
- Gmina: Biały Bór
- Population: 12

Dalkowo [dalˈkɔvɔ] is a settlement in the administrative district of Gmina Biały Bór, within Szczecinek County, West Pomeranian Voivodeship, in north-western Poland. It lies approximately 3 km (2 mi) north-east of Biały Bór, 25 km (16 mi) north-east of Szczecinek, and 161 km (100 mi) east of the regional capital Szczecin.

For the history of the region, see History of Pomerania.

The settlement has a population of 12.
