= Gnilec (river) =

Location
- Country: Poland
- Voivodeships: Pomeranian, West Pomeranian

Physical characteristics
- Source
  - location: near the village of Biała, West Pomeranian Voivodeship
  - coordinates: 53°50′37.0″N 16°49′10.0″E
- Mouth: Czernica
  - location: Czarne, Pomeranian Voivodeship
  - coordinates: 53°41′26″N 16°56′37″E
  - elevation: 128.2 m (421 ft)
- Length: 17.85 km (11.09 mi)
- Basin size: 44.58 km^{2} (17.21 mi^{2})

Basin features
- Progression: Czernica→ Gwda→ Noteć→ Warta→ Oder→ Baltic Sea

Gnilec is a river of Poland, a tributary of the Czernica in Czarne.
