= Donimierz, West Pomeranian Voivodeship =

Donimierz
- Settlement
- Location within Poland
- Coordinates: 53°54′10″N 16°54′14″E
- Country: Poland
- Voivodeship: West Pomeranian
- County: Szczecinek
- Gmina: Biały Bór

Donimierz [dɔˈnimjɛʂ] is a settlement in the administrative district of Gmina Biały Bór, within Szczecinek County, West Pomeranian Voivodeship, in north-western Poland. It lies approximately 5 km (3 mi) east of Biały Bór, 26 km (16 mi) north-east of Szczecinek, and 163 km (101 mi) east of the regional capital Szczecin.

For the history of the region, see History of Pomerania.
