= Koleśnik =

- Settlement
- Location within Poland
- Coordinates: 53°47′7″N 16°55′28″E
- Country: Poland
- Voivodeship: West Pomeranian
- County: Szczecinek
- Gmina: Biały Bór
- Population: 20

Koleśnik [kɔˈlɛɕnik] is a settlement in the administrative district of Gmina Biały Bór, within Szczecinek County, West Pomeranian Voivodeship, in north-western Poland. It lies approximately 14 km (9 mi) south-east of Biały Bór, 18 km (11 mi) north-east of Szczecinek, and 160 km (99 mi) east of the regional capital Szczecin.

For the history of the region, see History of Pomerania.

The settlement has a population of 20.
