= Borzęcino =

Borzęcino may refer to the following places:

- Borzęcino, Pomeranian Voivodeship (north Poland)
- Borzęcino, Gmina Barwice in West Pomeranian Voivodeship (north-west Poland)
- Borzęcino, Gmina Biały Bór in West Pomeranian Voivodeship (north-west Poland)
