= Rosłonki =

- Settlement
- Location within Poland
- Coordinates: 53°49′32″N 16°47′29″E
- Country: Poland
- Voivodeship: West Pomeranian
- County: Szczecinek
- Gmina: Biały Bór

Rosłonki [rɔˈswɔnki] is a settlement in the administrative district of Gmina Biały Bór, within Szczecinek County, West Pomeranian Voivodeship, in north-western Poland. It lies approximately 9 km (6 mi) south of Biały Bór, 15 km (9 mi) north-east of Szczecinek, and 153 km (95 mi) east of the regional capital Szczecin.

For the history of the region, see History of Pomerania.
