= Błogowo =

- Settlement
- Location within Poland
- Coordinates: 53°58′57″N 16°48′53″E
- Country: Poland
- Voivodeship: West Pomeranian
- County: Szczecinek
- Gmina: Biały Bór

Błogowo [bwɔˈɡɔvɔ] is a settlement in the administrative district of Gmina Biały Bór, within Szczecinek County, West Pomeranian Voivodeship, in north-western Poland. It lies approximately 10 km (6 mi) north of Biały Bór, 31 km (19 mi) north of Szczecinek, and 160 km (99 mi) north-east of the regional capital Szczecin.

For the history of the region, see History of Pomerania.
