= Domaradz, West Pomeranian Voivodeship =

Domaradz
- Settlement
- Location within Poland
- Coordinates: 53°47′6″N 16°48′32″E
- Country: Poland
- Voivodeship: West Pomeranian
- County: Szczecinek
- Gmina: Biały Bór

Domaradz [dɔˈmarat͡s] is a settlement in the administrative district of Gmina Biały Bór, within Szczecinek County, West Pomeranian Voivodeship, in north-western Poland. It lies approximately 13 km (8 mi) south of Biały Bór, 12 km (7 mi) north-east of Szczecinek, and 153 km (95 mi) east of the regional capital Szczecin.

For the history of the region, see History of Pomerania.
