= Miłkowo, Szczecinek County =

Miłkowo
- Settlement
- Location within Poland
- Coordinates: 53°59′2″N 16°50′25″E
- Country: Poland
- Voivodeship: West Pomeranian
- County: Szczecinek
- Gmina: Biały Bór

Miłkowo [miu̯ˈkɔvɔ] is a settlement in the administrative district of Gmina Biały Bór, within Szczecinek County, West Pomeranian Voivodeship, in north-western Poland. It lies approximately 10 km (6 mi) north of Biały Bór, 32 km (20 mi) north of Szczecinek, and 162 km (101 mi) north-east of the regional capital Szczecin.

For the history of the region, see History of Pomerania.
