= Alja Kozorog =

Slovenian slalom canoeist (born 1996)

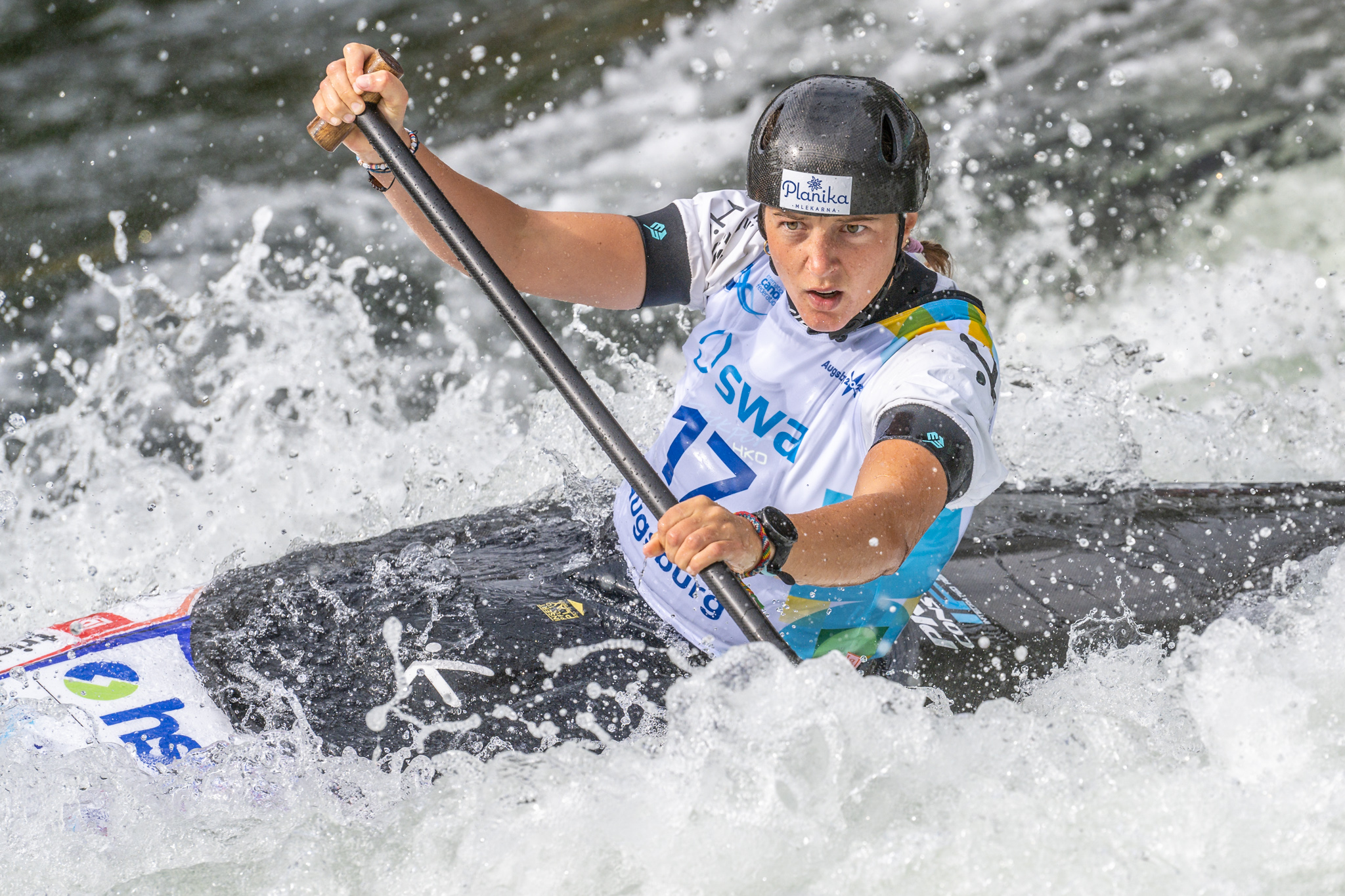
- Alja Kozorog in 2022

Personal information
- Nationality: Slovenian
- Born: 17 December 1996 (age 29)
- Home town: Idrija pri Bači

Sport
- Country: Slovenia
- Sport: Canoe slalom
- Event: C1, K1
- Club: KK Soške Elektrarne
- Coached by: Borut Javornik
Medal record
Women's canoe slalom
Representing Slovenia
World Championships
Bronze medal – third place	2023 London	C1 team
European Championships
Silver medal – second place	2020 Prague	C1 team
Silver medal – second place	2024 Tacen	C1 team
U23 European Championships
Silver medal – second place	2017 Hohenlimburg	C1 team
Junior World Championships
Bronze medal – third place	2013 Liptovský Mikuláš	K1 team

Alja Kozorog (born 17 December 1996) is a Slovenian slalom canoeist who has competed at the international level since 2012. She is from Idrija pri Bači and trains with KK Soške Elektrarne. Alja is coached by 1992 Olympian Borut Javornik.

Kozorog won a bronze medal in the C1 team event at the 2023 ICF Canoe Slalom World Championships in London. She also won two silver medals in the same event at the European Championships. She won a silver medal in C1 team event at the 2017 U23 European Championships in Hohenlimburg.

Alja earned her best senior world championship result of 19th in the C1 event at the 2019 championships in La Seu d'Urgell, which secured Slovenia an Olympic quota. She finished in a career-best 4th place at the 2019 World Cup on her home course in Tacen.

Kozorog finished in 12th place at the 2021 European Championships in Ivrea, ensuring her position at the delayed Games. Alja represented Slovenia in the C1 event at the delayed 2020 Summer Olympics in Tokyo, where she finished 12th after being eliminated in the semifinal.

Alja has studied at the University of Ljubljana where she completed a master's degree in Kinesiology in 2019.
