= Stępień, West Pomeranian Voivodeship =

Stępień
- Village
- Location within Poland
- Coordinates: 53°49′18″N 16°46′2″E
- Country: Poland
- Voivodeship: West Pomeranian
- County: Szczecinek
- Gmina: Biały Bór
- Population: 340

Stępień [ˈstɛmpjɛɲ] is a village in the administrative district of Gmina Biały Bór, within Szczecinek County, West Pomeranian Voivodeship, in north-western Poland. It lies approximately 10 km (6 mi) south-west of Biały Bór, 13 km (8 mi) north-east of Szczecinek, and 152 km (94 mi) east of the regional capital Szczecin.

For the history of the region, see History of Pomerania.

The village has a population of 340.
