= Białka, West Pomeranian Voivodeship =

Białka
- Village
- Location within Poland
- Coordinates: 53°51′22″N 16°50′48″E
- Country: Poland
- Voivodeship: West Pomeranian
- County: Szczecinek
- Gmina: Biały Bór
- Population: 50

Białka [ˈbjau̯ka] is a village in the administrative district of Gmina Biały Bór, within Szczecinek County, West Pomeranian Voivodeship, in north-western Poland. It lies approximately 5 km (3 mi) south of Biały Bór, 19 km (12 mi) north-east of Szczecinek, and 158 km (98 mi) east of the regional capital Szczecin.

For the history of the region, see History of Pomerania.

The village has a population of 50.
