= Drzonowo, Szczecinek County =

Drzonowo
- village
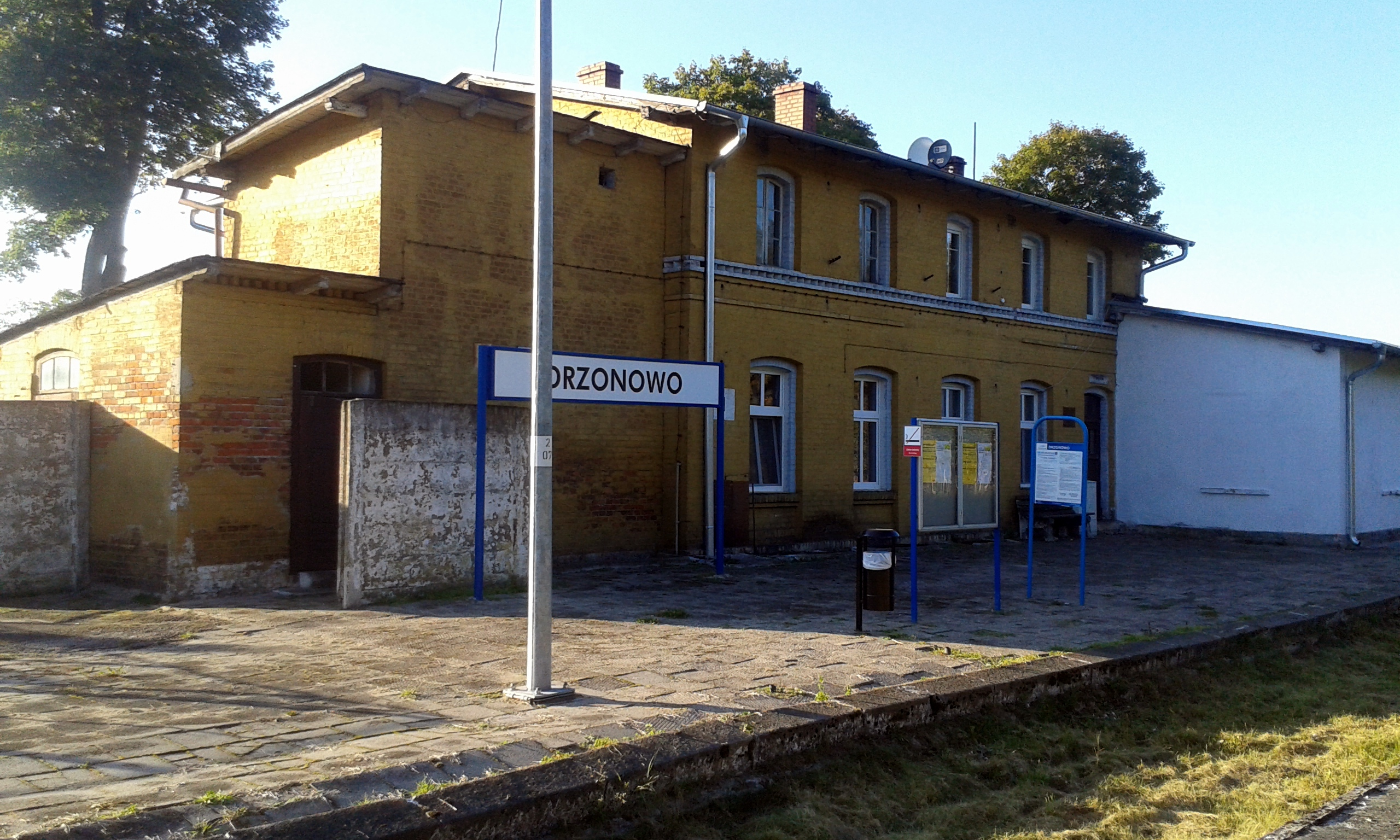
- Train station in Drzonowo

- Location within Poland
- Coordinates: 53°48′52″N 16°50′51″E
- Country: Poland
- Voivodeship: West Pomeranian
- County: Szczecinek
- Gmina: Biały Bór
- Population: 190

Drzonowo [dʐɔˈnɔvɔ] (German: Schönau) is a village in the administrative district of Gmina Biały Bór, within Szczecinek County, West Pomeranian Voivodeship, in north-western Poland. It lies approximately 10 km (6 mi) south of Biały Bór, 16 km (10 mi) north-east of Szczecinek, and 156 km (97 mi) east of the regional capital Szczecin.

For the history of the region, see History of Pomerania.

The village has a population of 190.

== Notable residents ==
- Margarete Bieber (1879 – 1978), art historian
