= Biskupice, West Pomeranian Voivodeship =

Biskupice
- Village
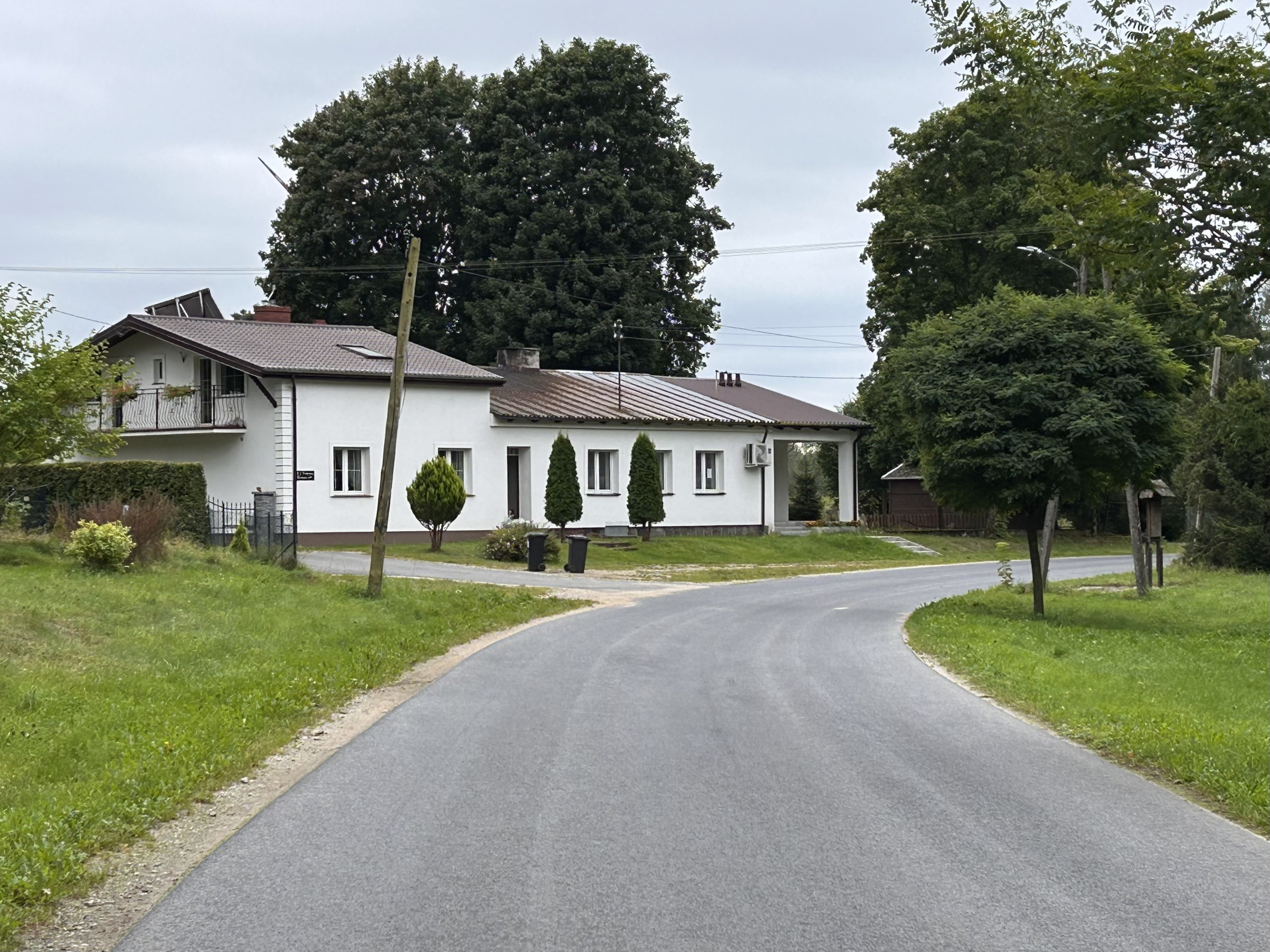

- Location within Poland
- Coordinates: 53°52′23″N 16°47′51″E
- Country: Poland
- Voivodeship: West Pomeranian
- County: Szczecinek
- Gmina: Biały Bór
- Population: 40
- Time zone: UTC+1 (CET)
  - Summer (DST): UTC+2 (CEST)

Biskupice [biskuˈpit͡sɛ] is a village in the administrative district of Gmina Biały Bór, within Szczecinek County, West Pomeranian Voivodeship, in north-western Poland. It lies approximately 4 km (2 mi) south-west of Biały Bór, 19 km (12 mi) north-east of Szczecinek, and 155 km (96 mi) east of the regional capital Szczecin.

The village has a population of 40.
