= Grabowo, Szczecinek County =

Grabowo
- Village
- Location within Poland
- Coordinates: 53°53′23″N 16°56′16″E
- Country: Poland
- Voivodeship: West Pomeranian
- County: Szczecinek
- Gmina: Biały Bór
- Population: 310

Grabowo [ɡraˈbɔvɔ] (formerly German: Grabau) is a village in the administrative district of Gmina Biały Bór, within Szczecinek County, West Pomeranian Voivodeship, in north-western Poland. It lies approximately 7 km (4 mi) east of Biały Bór, 26 km (16 mi) north-east of Szczecinek, and 164 km (102 mi) east of the regional capital Szczecin.

For the history of the region, see History of Pomerania.

The village has a population of 310.
