= Trzebiele, Szczecinek County =

Trzebiele
- Village
- Location within Poland
- Coordinates: 53°54′56″N 16°53′3″E
- Country: Poland
- Voivodeship: West Pomeranian
- County: Szczecinek
- Gmina: Biały Bór
- Population: 180

Trzebiele [tʂɛˈbjɛlɛ] is a village in the administrative district of Gmina Biały Bór, within Szczecinek County, West Pomeranian Voivodeship, in north-western Poland. It lies approximately 4 km (2 mi) north-east of Biały Bór, 26 km (16 mi) north-east of Szczecinek, and 162 km (101 mi) east of the regional capital Szczecin.

For the history of the region, see the article on History of Pomerania.

The village has a population of 180.
