= Kaliska, Szczecinek County =

Kaliska
- Village
- Location within Poland
- Coordinates: 53°55′26″N 16°50′53″E
- Country: Poland
- Voivodeship: West Pomeranian
- County: Szczecinek
- Gmina: Biały Bór
- Population: 200
- Time zone: UTC+1 (CET)
  - Summer (DST): UTC+2 (CEST)
- Vehicle registration: ZSZ

Kaliska [kaˈliska] is a village in the administrative district of Gmina Biały Bór, within Szczecinek County, West Pomeranian Voivodeship, in north-western Poland. It lies approximately 3 km (2 mi) north of Biały Bór, 26 km (16 mi) north-east of Szczecinek, and 160 km (99 mi) east of the regional capital Szczecin. It is located within the historic region of Pomerania.

The village has a population of 200.

Kaliska was a royal village of the Polish Crown, administratively located in the Człuchów County in the Pomeranian Voivodeship. It was annexed by Prussia in the First Partition of Poland in 1772, from 1871 it was part of Germany, and following Germany's defeat in World War II in 1945 it was restored to Poland.
