= Eugen Hadamovsky =

German propagandist (1904–1945)

- Born: Eugen Paul Hadamovsky; 14 December 1904; Berlin, Kingdom of Prussia, German Empire
- Died: 1 March 1945 (aged 40); Hölkewiese, Nazi Germany
- Cause of death: Killed in action
- Military career
- Allegiance: Nazi Germany
- Branch: Schutzstaffel
- Rank: Obersturmführer
- Unit: 4th SS Polizei Panzergrenadier Division
- Conflicts: World War II
- Awards: Iron Cross First Class, War Merit Cross First Class

Eugen Paul Hadamovsky (14 December 1904 – 1 March 1945) was a politician and radio production director in Nazi Germany from 1933 to 1942.

== Early years ==
Hadamovsky was born and raised in Berlin; he joined the paramilitary Freikorps forces while still a secondary school student. When the Freikorps units were dissolved in 1921, his life became erratic, working as a locksmith and mechanic at varying places. Back in Berlin from 1928, he was an early Nazi supporter, who helped organize Nazi radio listeners and handled the technical details at many of Hitler's mass rallies. Hadamovsky joined the Nazi Party (NSDAP) in 1930; the party's propaganda leader Joseph Goebbels commissioned him to build up the right-wing Reichsverband Deutscher Rundfunkteilnehmer ("Reich association of German broadcasting participants").

== Hitler's Rise to Power as Career Booster ==
Shortly after the Nazi seizure of power in January 1933, Hadamovsky served as the National Programming Director for the German Deutschlandsender broadcaster. A few months later, he was appointed Reich production director and head of the nationalized Reichs-Rundfunk-Gesellschaft, whereby he played a vital role in the Nazi Gleichschaltung of the incorporated regional broadcasters. In 1935 he initiated the launch of the Fernsehsender Paul Nipkow TV station. Hadamovsky also served as vice-president of the broadcasting department in the Reichskulturkammer organization and in a variety of other posts during World War II. He was head of the radio department in the Reich Ministry of Public Enlightenment and Propaganda from 1940, however, Minister Goebbels was not entirely pleased with him, as is evident by many references in Goebbels' diaries. In 1942 Hadamovsky was replaced and took over the position as chief of staff in the Nazi Party's Central Propaganda Office (Reichspropagandaleitung) in Berlin.

== Author ==
Hadamovsky authored seven propaganda books, the most significant of which was "Propaganda and National Power" (1933), the only book treating the general principles of propaganda published during the Third Reich. Other books include "World History on the March", which was published just before the 1939 Invasion of Poland, and applauded Nazi Germany in general and the return of the Memel Territory, Adolf Hitler's last negotiated territorial gain, previously lost to Lithuania after World War I. Hadamovsky was also author of Blitzmarsch nach Warschau: Frontberichte eines politischen Soldaten (Lightning March to Warsaw: Front Reports of a Political Soldier), an eyewitness account of the Invasion of Poland (1939).

== Military service and death ==
In 1943, Hadamovsky volunteered for the Wehrmacht armed forces. Toward the end of World War II, he joined the 4th SS Polizei Panzergrenadier Division and died in combat, shot through the heart, in the rank of an Obersturmführer (first lieutenant), fighting at the head of his company on the Eastern Front early in March 1945 at Hölkewiese near Rummelsburg in Pomerania. After his death, Goebbels wrote of him as one of the best comrades, an energetic and loyal companion and an old friend. Hadamovsky is buried in Endgrablage: Block 3 Reihe 31 Grab 1533 - 1548, German military cemetery Neumark / Stare Czarnowo, Poland.
