= Gmina Biały Bór =

Gmina Biały Bór Biały Bór Commune
- Gmina
- Coat of arms
- Interactive map of Gmina Biały Bór
- Coordinates (Biały Bór): 53°53′55″N 16°50′16″E
- Country: Poland
- Voivodeship: West Pomeranian
- County: Szczecinek
- Seat: Biały Bór

Area
  - Total: 270.23 km^{2} (104.34 sq mi)

Population (2006)
  - Total: 5,166
  - Density: 19.12/km^{2} (49.51/sq mi)
  - Urban: 2,127
  - Rural: 3,039
- Website: http://www.bialybor.netbiz.pl/

Gmina Biały Bór is an urban-rural gmina (administrative district) in Szczecinek County, West Pomeranian Voivodeship, in north-western Poland. Its seat is the town of Biały Bór, which lies approximately 23 kilometres (14 mi) north-east of Szczecinek and 159 km (99 mi) east of the regional capital Szczecin.

The gmina covers an area of 270.23 square kilometres (104.3 sq mi), and as of 2006 its total population is 5,166 (out of which the population of Biały Bór amounts to 2,127, and the population of the rural part of the gmina is 3,039).

== Villages ==
Apart from the town of Biały Bór, Gmina Biały Bór contains the villages and settlements of Bagniewko, Biała, Białka, Biały Dwór, Bielica, Biskupice, Biskupice-Kolonia, Błogowo, Borzęcino, Brzeźnica, Cieszęcino, Cybulin, Dalkowo, Dołgie, Domaradz, Donimierz, Drzonowo, Dyminek, Grabowo, Jawory, Kaliska, Kamienna, Kazimierz, Kierzkowo, Koleśnik, Kołtki, Kosobudy, Linowo, Lubiesz, Miłkowo, Miłobądz, Ponikwa, Przybrda, Radzewo, Rosłonki, Rzyszczewko, Sępolno Małe, Sępolno Wielkie, Stępień, Stepno, Świerszczewo, Trzebiele, and Zduny.

== Neighbouring gminas ==
Gmina Biały Bór is bordered by the gminas of Bobolice, Koczała, Miastko, Polanów, Rzeczenica, and Szczecinek.
