= Zduny, West Pomeranian Voivodeship =

Zduny
- Village
- Location within Poland
- Coordinates: 53°59′02″N 16°50′25″E
- Country: Poland
- Voivodeship: West Pomeranian
- County: Szczecinek
- Gmina: Biały Bór

Zduny [ˈzdunɨ] is a village in the administrative district of Gmina Biały Bór, within Szczecinek County, West Pomeranian Voivodeship, in north-western Poland.

For the history of the region, see History of Pomerania.
