= Kołtki =

- Village
- Location within Poland
- Coordinates: 53°57′25″N 16°50′50″E
- Country: Poland
- Voivodeship: West Pomeranian
- County: Szczecinek
- Gmina: Biały Bór
- Population: 100

Kołtki [ˈkɔu̯tki] is a village in the administrative district of Gmina Biały Bór, within Szczecinek County, West Pomeranian Voivodeship, in north-western Poland. It lies approximately 7 km (4 mi) north of Biały Bór, 29 km (18 mi) north of Szczecinek, and 161 km (100 mi) east of the regional capital Szczecin.

For the history of the region, see History of Pomerania.

The village has a population of 100.
