= Pečine =

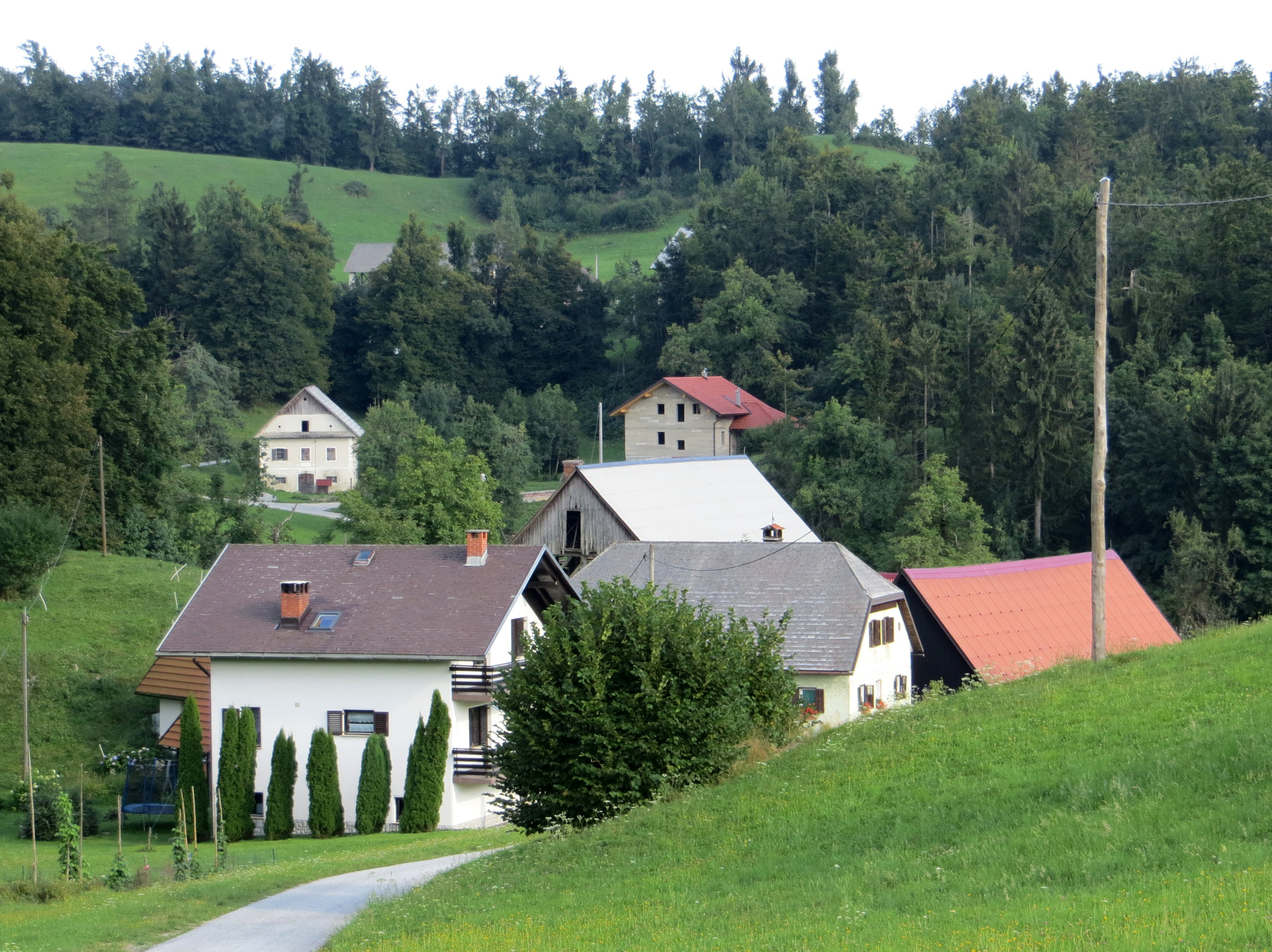
- The hamlet of Kal in Pečine

- Location in Slovenia
- Coordinates: 46°7′21.1″N 13°49′52.73″E
- Country: Slovenia
- Traditional region: Slovenian Littoral
- Statistical region: Gorizia
- Municipality: Tolmin

Area
  - Total: 4.93 km^{2} (1.90 sq mi)
- Elevation: 611 m (2,005 ft)

Population (2002)
  - Total: 156

Pečine (pronounced [ˈpeːtʃinɛ]) is a village in the mountains above the right bank of the Idrijca River in the Municipality of Tolmin in the Littoral region of Slovenia. It includes the hamlets of Črni Vrh, Kabiunk, Kal, Maraževec, Podkal, Travnik, and Stari Rut.

== Name ==
The name Pečine is a plural form derived from the word peč 'large cliff, rocky wall' (which developed from the earlier meaning 'hollow in a cliff', ultimately from 'place for cooking'). Like similar names (e.g., Peč, Pečice, Pečke, etc.), it refers to a local landscape element.

== History ==
In the hamlet of Stari Rut, 1 km northwest of Pečine, are the remains of an ancient hill fort. This site is still referred to as Castle Peak (Slovene: Vrh gradu) locally. A silver Roman fibula found in the area, now kept at the museum in Tolmin, attests to early settlement here.

During the Second World War, the village was bombarded by German forces in February 1944, destroying several houses. A battle took place between German forces and Yugoslav Partisan units in the hamlet of Travnik on 19 March 1945, and another engagement at the hill to the west known as Lorčevo brdo in April 1945.

== Church ==
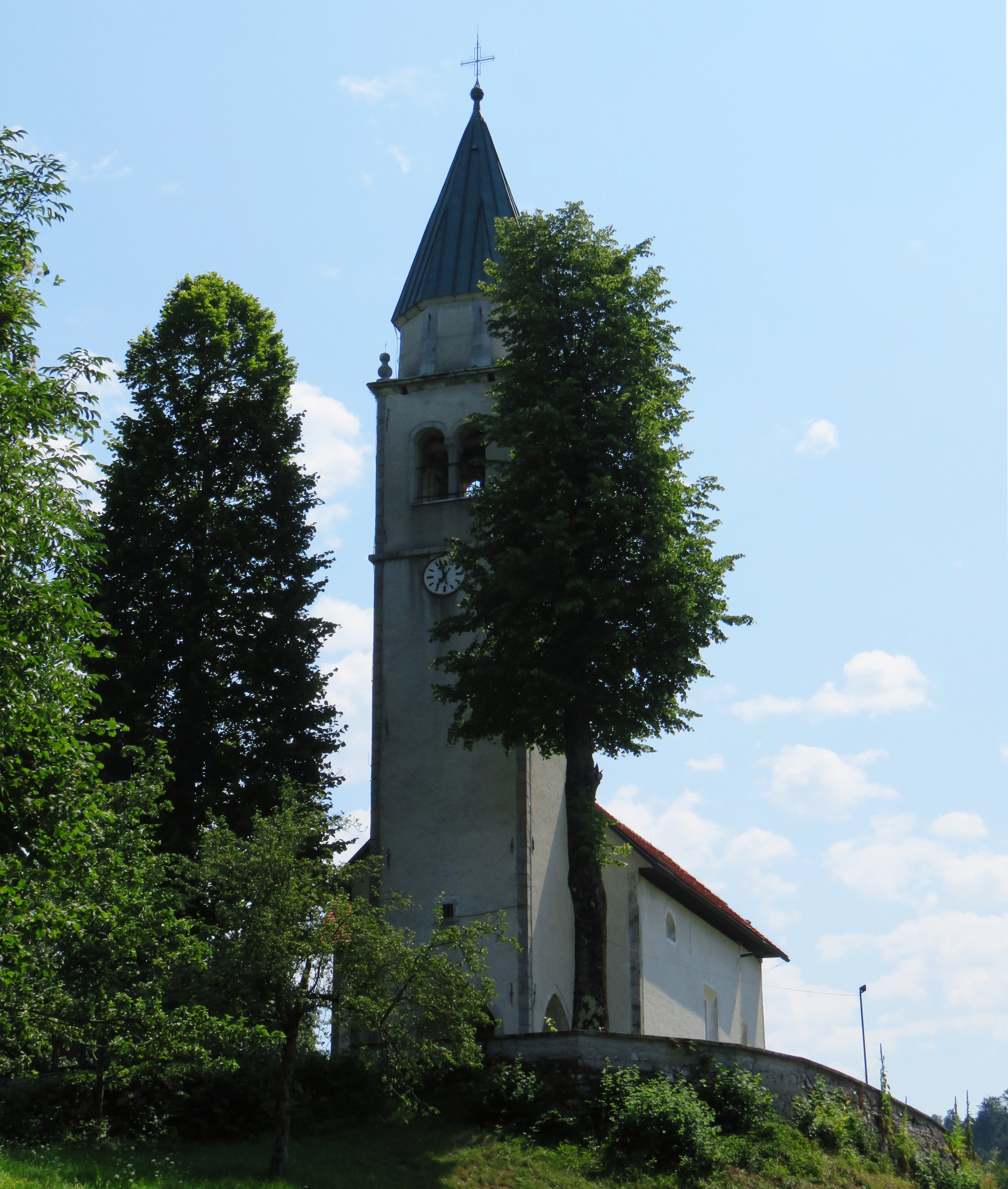
Saints Hermagoras and Fortunatus Church

The parish church in the settlement is dedicated to Saints Hermagoras and Fortunatus and belongs to the Diocese of Koper. The church and its portico were renovated in 1896, and in 1932 it was decorated with paintings by Cene Lapanja (1886–1966) from the neighboring village of Ponikve.

== Notable people ==
Notable people that were born or lived in Pečine include:

- Jakob Filip Kaffol (1820–1864), religious writer
