= Radzewo, Szczecinek County =

Radzewo
- Village
- Location within Poland
- Coordinates: 53°48′48″N 16°54′26″E
- Country: Poland
- Voivodeship: West Pomeranian
- County: Szczecinek
- Gmina: Biały Bór

Radzewo [raˈd͡zɛvɔ] is a village in the administrative district of Gmina Biały Bór, within Szczecinek County, West Pomeranian Voivodeship, in north-western Poland.

For the history of the region, see History of Pomerania.
