= Stepno =

- Village
- Location within Poland
- Coordinates: 53°49′20″N 16°44′48″E
- Country: Poland
- Voivodeship: West Pomeranian
- County: Szczecinek
- Gmina: Biały Bór

Stepno [ˈstɛpnɔ] is a village in the administrative district of Gmina Biały Bór, within Szczecinek County, West Pomeranian Voivodeship, in north-western Poland.

For the history of the region, see History of Pomerania.

Stepno is also part of the Russian-language place names Stepnogorsk in Kazakhstan (location of the Stepnogorsk Scientific and Technical Institute for Microbiology), Stepno-Baltay in the Irkutsk region and Stepno-Durasovo in the Samara region, as well as Russian place names Stepnoy or Stepnoye.

In the United States, Stepno begins to appear as a family name in census records in the early twentieth century, used by immigrants giving their birthplace as Russia, Austria, Czechoslovakia, Poland, Yugoslavia and (as "de Stepno" or "di Stepno") Italy.

On the Internet, the domain stepno.com was registered 6 March 2000 to serve as the home page for a United States–based journalism, media studies and Web design professor by that name.

The Web service Forbears.io estimates that "Stepno" is only the 3,185,033rd most common surname in the world, with only 38 identified.
