= Bagniewko, West Pomeranian Voivodeship =

Bagniewko
- Village
- Location within Poland
- Coordinates: 53°58′50″N 16°50′48″E
- Country: Poland
- Voivodeship: West Pomeranian
- County: Szczecinek
- Gmina: Biały Bór

Bagniewko [baɡˈɲɛfkɔ] is a village in the administrative district of Gmina Biały Bór, within Szczecinek County, West Pomeranian Voivodeship, in north-western Poland.

For the history of the region, see History of Pomerania.
