= Ponikwa, West Pomeranian Voivodeship =

Ponikwa
- Settlement
- Location within Poland
- Coordinates: 53°54′19″N 16°57′25″E
- Country: Poland
- Voivodeship: West Pomeranian
- County: Szczecinek
- Gmina: Biały Bór
- Population: 20

Ponikwa [pɔˈnikfa] is a settlement in the administrative district of Gmina Biały Bór, within Szczecinek County, West Pomeranian Voivodeship, in north-western Poland. It lies approximately 8 km (5 mi) east of Biały Bór, 28 km (17 mi) north-east of Szczecinek, and 166 km (103 mi) east of the regional capital Szczecin.

For the history of the region, see History of Pomerania.

The settlement has a population of 20.
