= Kosobudy, Szczecinek County =

Kosobudy
- Village
- Location within Poland
- Coordinates: 53°58′17″N 16°50′38″E
- Country: Poland
- Voivodeship: West Pomeranian
- County: Szczecinek
- Gmina: Biały Bór

Kosobudy [kɔsɔˈbudɨ] is a village in the administrative district of Gmina Biały Bór, within Szczecinek County, West Pomeranian Voivodeship, in north-western Poland.

For the history of the region, see History of Pomerania.
