= Ponikve, Cerknica =

Ponikve
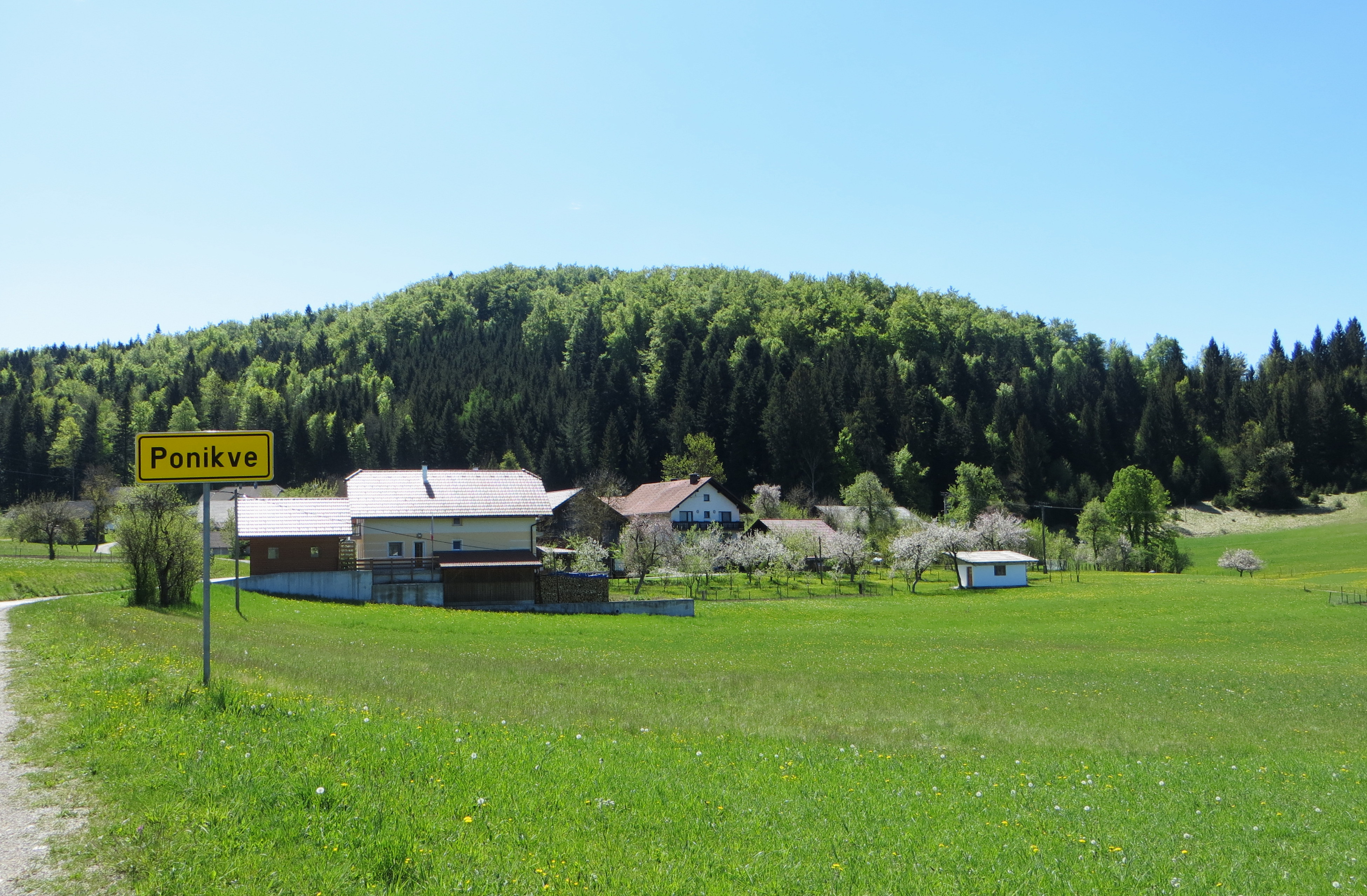

- Location in Slovenia
- Coordinates: 45°49′0.74″N 14°26′21.53″E
- Country: Slovenia
- Traditional region: Inner Carniola
- Statistical region: Littoral–Inner Carniola
- Municipality: Cerknica

Area
  - Total: 2 km^{2} (0.77 sq mi)
- Elevation: 656.4 m (2,154 ft)

Population (2020)
  - Total: 27
  - Density: 14/km^{2} (35/sq mi)
- Postal code: 1380 Cerknica

Ponikve (pronounced [pɔˈniːkʋɛ]) is a small settlement to the east of Begunje in the Municipality of Cerknica in the Inner Carniola region of Slovenia.

== Name ==
The name Ponikve is a plural form derived from the word ponikva 'influent stream' or 'sinkhole' (into which such a stream disappears). In its plural form it refers to a gently rolling landscape consisting of the basins of an influent stream. Like other villages named Ponikve and similar names (e.g., Ponikva), it refers to a local landscape element.
