= Ponikve (Golubac) =

Ponikve Поникве
- Village
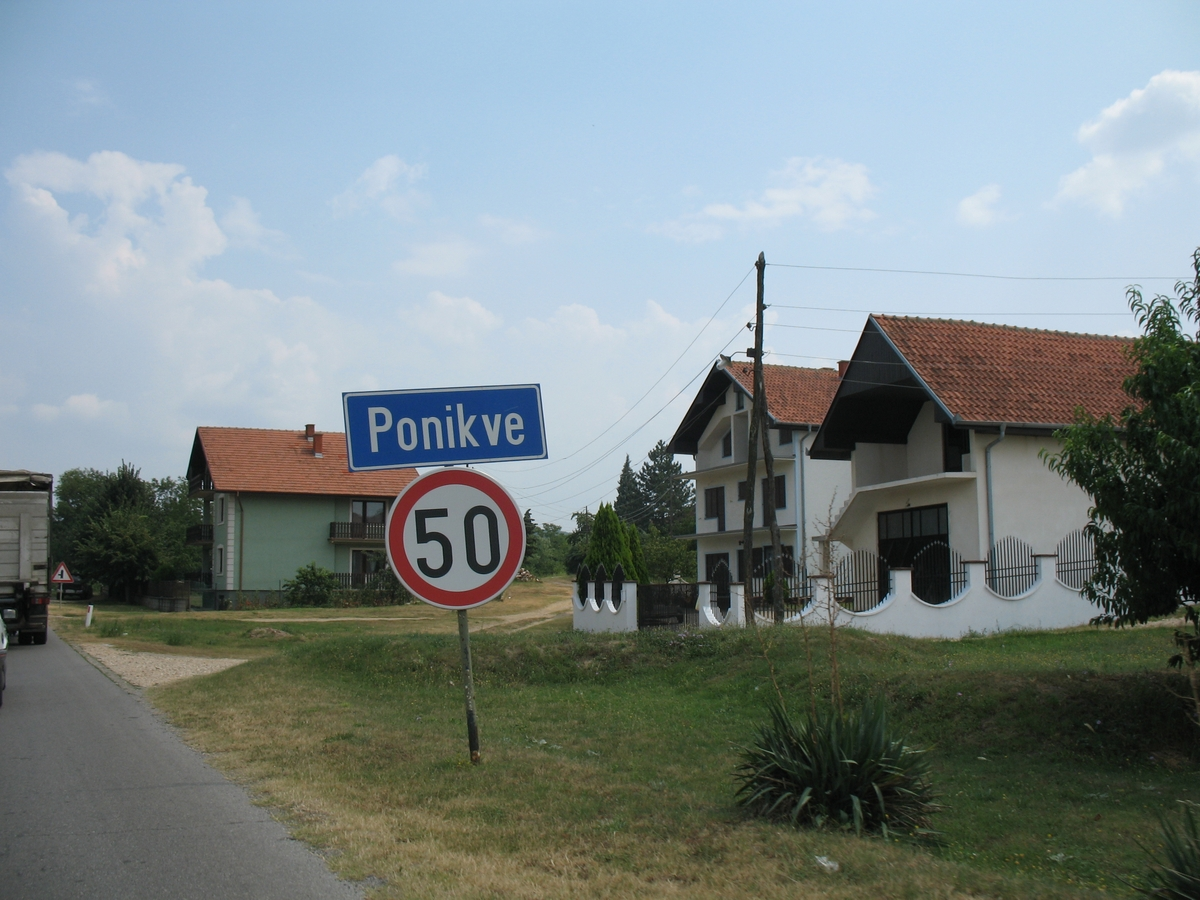

- Location within Serbia
- Coordinates: 44°41′26″N 21°34′05″E
- Country: Serbia
- District: Braničevo District
- Municipality: Golubac

Population (2002)
  - Total: 97
- Time zone: UTC+1 (CET)
  - Summer (DST): UTC+2 (CEST)

Ponikve is a village in the municipality of Golubac, Serbia. According to the 2002 census, the village has a population of 97 people.
