= Idrija pri Bači =

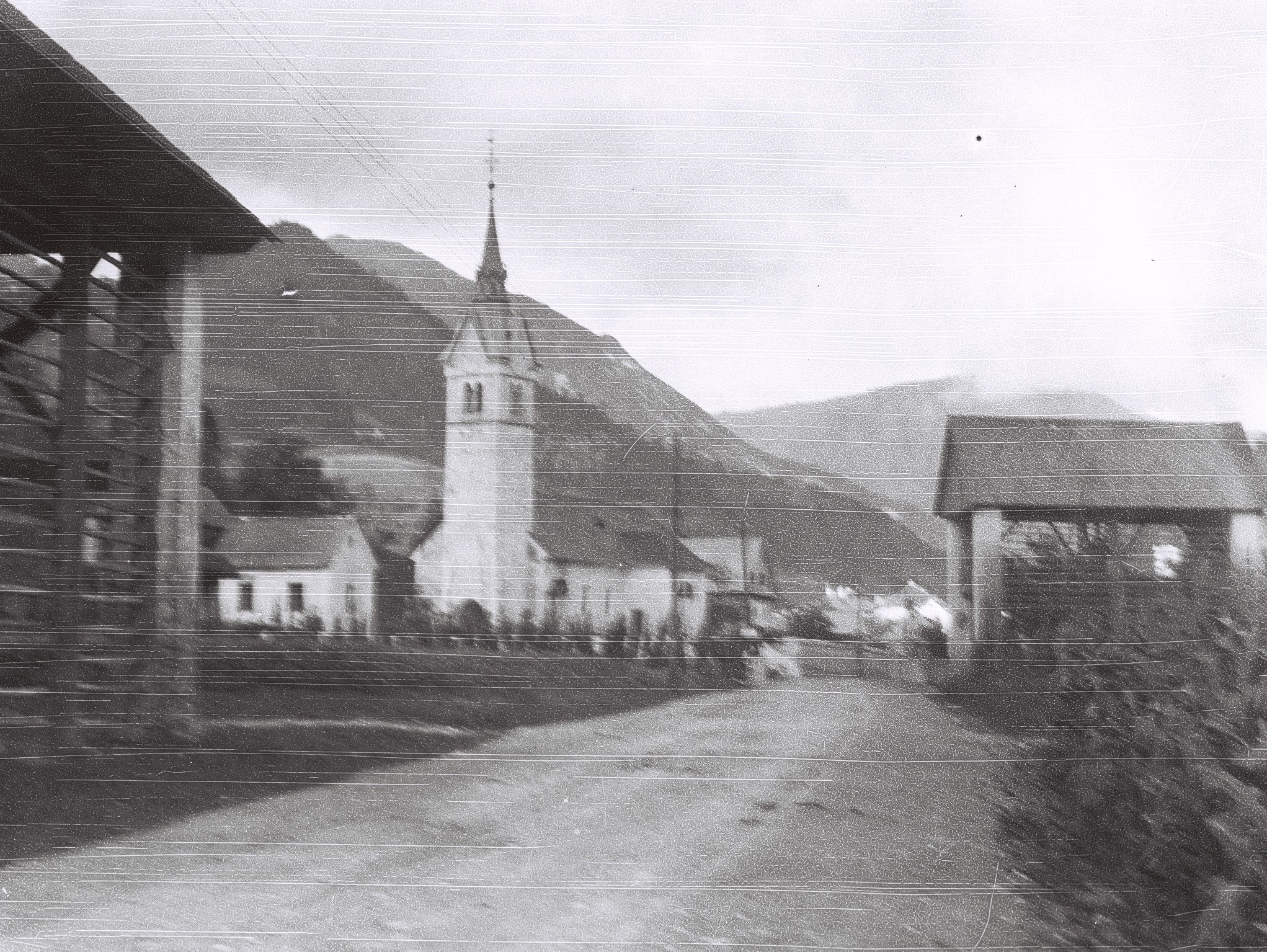

- Location in Slovenia
- Coordinates: 46°8′19.39″N 13°46′45.58″E
- Country: Slovenia
- Traditional region: Slovenian Littoral
- Statistical region: Gorizia
- Municipality: Tolmin

Area
  - Total: 5.03 km^{2} (1.94 sq mi)
- Elevation: 174.8 m (573 ft)

Population (2002)
  - Total: 313

Idrija pri Bači (pronounced [ˈiːdɾija pɾi ˈbaːtʃi]) is a village on the right bank of the Idrijca River in the Municipality of Tolmin in the Littoral region of Slovenia.

The parish church in the settlement is dedicated to John the Baptist and belongs to the Koper Diocese.

Archaeological excavations near the settlement in the late 19th century revealed a late Iron Age (5th century BC) necropolis of 47 graves with finds of tools and inscriptions in Venetic.
