= Ponikva =

Ponikva may refer to:

- Ponikva, Šentjur, a settlement in the Municipality of Šentjur, Slovenia
- Ponikva pri Žalcu, a settlement in the Municipality of Žalec, Slovenia
- Penk (Slovene: Ponikva), a village in the community of Feistritz ob Bleiburg, Austria
- Ponikva ski resort, ski resort on Mount Osogovo, North Macedonia
- A Slovene and Serbo-Croatian term for sinkhole, sometimes used in English
- Ponikva, a river in Karlovac County, Croatia

== See also ==
- Ponikwa (disambiguation)
