= Biały Bór =

Town in West Pomeranian Voivodeship, Poland

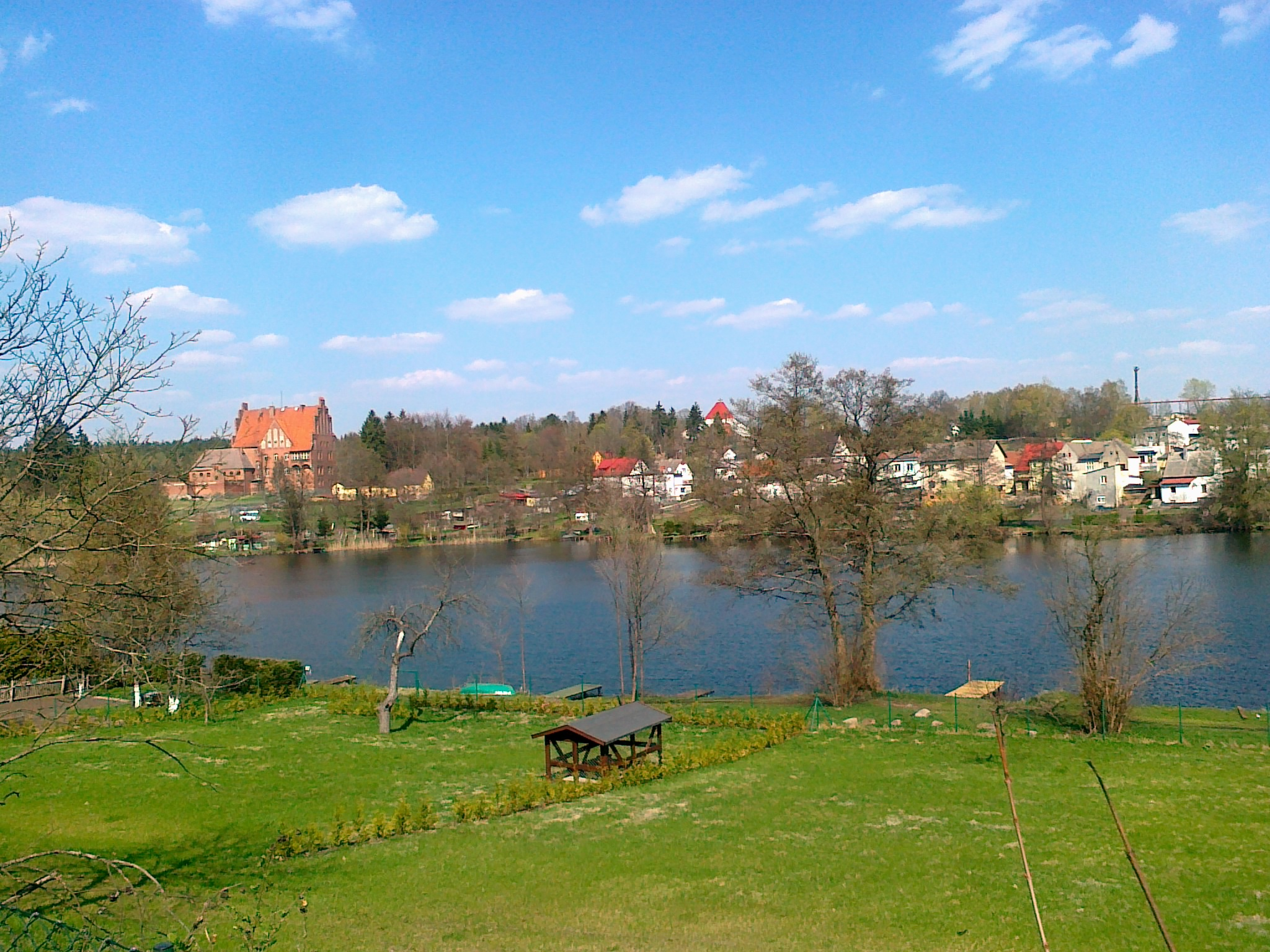
- Lake Ławiczka in Biały Bór

- Coat of arms

- Location within Poland
- Coordinates: 53°53′55″N 16°50′16″E
- Country: Poland
- Voivodeship: West Pomeranian
- County: Szczecinek
- Gmina: Biały Bór
- Established: 13th century
- Town rights: 1382

Government
  - Mayor: Paweł Stanisław Mikołajewski

Area
  - Total: 12.82 km^{2} (4.95 sq mi)

Population (31 December 2021)
  - Total: 2,226
  - Density: 174/km^{2} (450/sq mi)
- Time zone: UTC+1 (CET)
  - Summer (DST): UTC+2 (CEST)
- Postal code: 78-425
- Area code: +48 94
- Car plates: ZSZ
- Website: http://bialybor.com.pl/

Biały Bór (Polish: [ˈbjawɨ ˈbur]; German: Baldenburg) is a town in Szczecinek County, West Pomeranian Voivodeship, in northern Poland, with 2,226 inhabitants as of December 2021.

== History ==
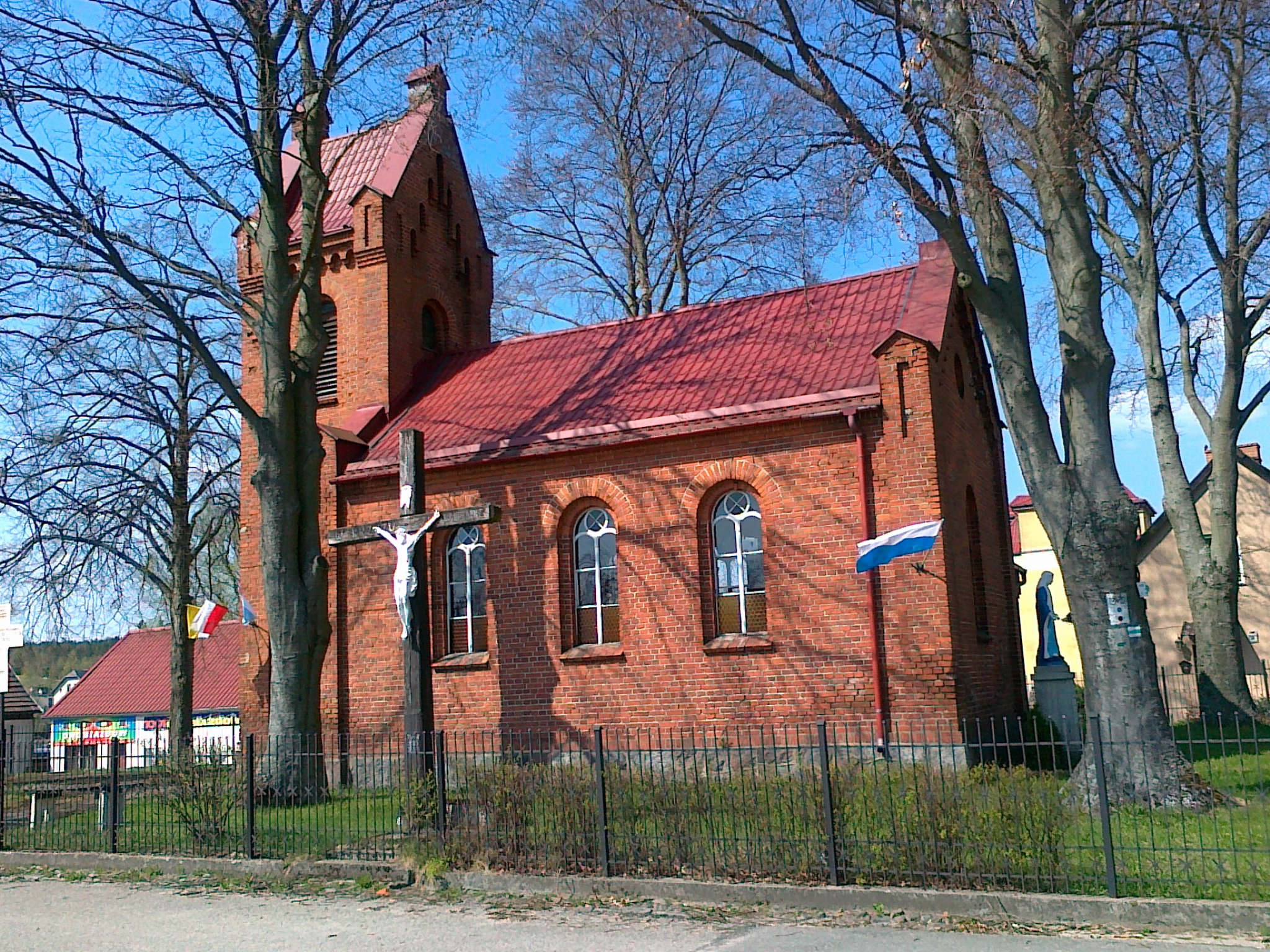
Saint Michael Archangel church in Biały Bór

The settlement was founded in the 13th century by a local noble Sebastian Lubjanski. It was part of Poland, until the Teutonic invasion in the early 14th century. Located at a formerly important crossroad, the Teutonic Knights built a fortification here, and in 1382 the settlement received Kulm law town rights. The town's development was stopped by a large fire in 1408. No traces remain of the castle, but remnants of the medieval town wall have been incorporated in some later houses.

During the Thirteen Years' War it was recaptured by the Poles in 1461, and it was confirmed as part of Poland in 1466. Since then it was administratively located in the Człuchów County in the Pomeranian Voivodeship until the First Partition of Poland in 1772, when it was annexed by Prussia, and subsequently from 1871 it was part of Germany.

Up until the 20th century, the town economy consisted mostly of fishing, agriculture, crafts and local trade. It was the centre of a cloth manufacturing industry from the 16th century until the 19th century, when it had to close due to competition from more modern industries. A railway connection to the town was established in 1878. While most of Gdańsk Pomerania was reintegrated with Poland after the country regained independence in 1918, the town was one of the few which remained within Germany and was included in the newly established province, provocatively named towards Poles the Frontier March of Posen-West Prussia. In 1939, the town had 2,292 inhabitants. The town had a Jewish community and a small synagogue prior to World War II and the Holocaust. During the war, Nazi Germany operated a forced labour subcamp of the Stalag II-B prisoner-of-war camp in the town. In January 1945, a German-perpetrated death march of Allied prisoners-of-war from the Stalag XX-B POW camp passed through the town. The town was reintegrated with Poland in 1945.

From 1950 to 1998, the town belonged to the Koszalin Voivodeship. A horse stud farm was founded in Biały Bór in 1956. Battle scenes for the 1969 film Colonel Wolodyjowski were filmed in Biały Bór.

== Transport ==
There is a railway station in Biały Bór.

== Notable residents ==
- Georg Ludwig Rudolf Maercker (1865-1924), World War I general
- Karl Ruß (1833-1899), ornithologist
