= Piotrowski =

Piotrowski (Polish pronunciation: [pjɔˈtrɔvski]; feminine: Piotrowska) is a Polish surname. It is a toponymic surname derived from any of places named Piotrów and Piotrowo, Pietrów, Piotrowice - all derived from the masculine given name Piotr (Peter).

In Poland, it was the 19th most common surname, with 61,844 bearers in 2009.

Notable persons with the surname include:

- Agnieszka Piotrowska (born 1964), Polish filmmaker
- Antoni Piotrowski (Bulgarian: Антони Пьотровски, Antoni Pyotrovski; 1853–1924), Polish painter
- Bernadeta Bocek-Piotrowska (born 1970), Polish cross country skier
- Damian Piotrowski (born 1987), Polish footballer
- Edward W. Piotrowski (born 1955), Polish physicist
- Gosia Piotrowska, Polish television actress
- Irene Piotrowski (1941–2020), Canadian athlete
- Jakub Piotrowski (born 1997), Polish footballer
- John L. Piotrowski (born 1934), U.S. Air Force general
- Józef Piotrowski (1840–1923), Russian enlightener
- Kathrin Piotrowski (born 1980), German badminton player
- Krystyna Piotrowska (1938–2022), Polish geologist, cartographer, professor
- Lillian Piotrowski (1911–1974), American politician
- Luke Piotrowski, American screenwriter
- Marek Piotrowski (born 1964), Polish kickboxer and boxer
- Maximilian Piotrowski (1813–1875), Polish painter
- Mirosław Piotrowski (born 1966), Polish politician
- Oskar Piotrowski (chess player) (fl. 1902–1935), Polish chess master
- Oskar Piotrowski (gymnast) (born 1996), Polish acrobatic gymnast
- Paweł Piotrowski (born 1985), Polish Paralympic athlete
- Robert Piotrowski (born 1963), American architect
- Ryszard Piotrowski (1924–2016), Polish war hero
- Sebastian Piotrowski (born 1990), German-Polish footballer
- Tadeusz Piotrowski (footballer) (1947–2023), Polish association footballer and manager
- Tadeusz Piotrowski (linguist), (born 1957), professor of linguistics and lexicographer
- Tadeusz Piotrowski (activist) (1945–1994), social activist and board member of the Polish Red Cross
- Tadeusz Piotrowski (mountaineer) (1940–1986), mountaineer and writer
- Tadeusz Piotrowski (sailor) (born 1940), sailor, engineer, and former Olympian.
- Tadeusz Piotrowski (sociologist) (born 1940), sociologist, historian and writer
- Tatjana Piotrowski, German molecular geneticist
- Teresa Piotrowska (born 1955), Polish politician
- Tom Piotrowski (basketball) (born 1960), American basketball player
- Tom Piotrowski (economist) (born c. 1960s), Australian economist
- Zygmunt A. Piotrowski (1904–1985), Polish born, American psychologist

== See also ==
- Wólka Piotrowska, a village in Podlaskie Voivodeship in Poland
