= Tom Piotrowski =

Tom Piotrowski may refer to:

- Tom Piotrowski (basketball) (born 1960), American basketball player
- Tom Piotrowski (economist) (born c. 1960s), Australian economist

== See also ==
- Piotrowski
