= Maksymiliana Piotrowskiego Street in Bydgoszcz =

Street in Bydgoszcz, Poland

Coordinates: 53°07′31″N 18°00′59″E

Bydgoszcz
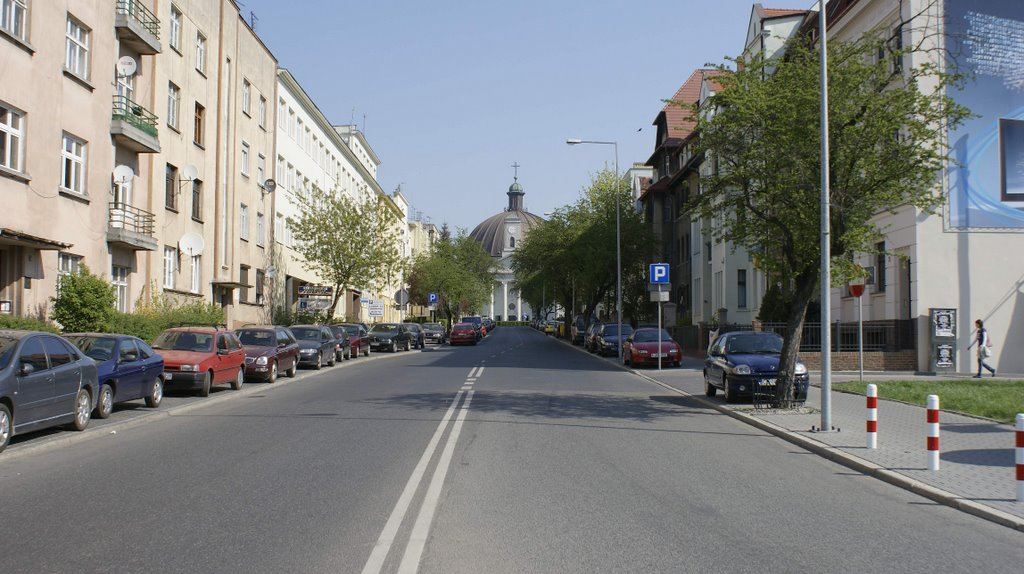
- View of the street to the north
- Interactive map of Maksymiliana Piotrowskiego Street in Bydgoszcz
- Native name: Ulica Maksymiliana Piotrowskiego w Bydgoszczy (Polish)
- Former names: ConradStraße, Ulica Ossolińskich
- Part of: Downtown district
- Namesake: Maximilian Piotrowski
- Owner: City of Bydgoszcz
- Length: 250 m (820 ft)
- Width: ca. 10m
- Location: Bydgoszcz, Poland

Construction
- Construction start: Early 1900s

Maksymiliana Piotrowskiego Street is a street of Bydgoszcz centre, in the vicinity of several city highlights. Many buildings along this path carry historical interest.

== Location ==
The street is laid on the eastern edge of the downtown district (Polish: Śródmieście). Steering north to south, it points to the historical gasworks building (south) and to the Saint Vincent de Paul Basilica (north).

Rather short, the path connects Jagiellońska street in the south to Markwarta street and Ossoliński avenue in the north.

Finally, the street is bordered in the west by the Ludowy Park and by the Focus Mall in the east.

== History ==
The area of the street has long been on the eastern limit of Bydgoszcz, before the repetitive extensions of the city territory in 1920. For this reason, the avenue was developed for urbanistic purposes not earlier than the beginning of the 20th century.

Though some plots start to appear in 1880, the first official references of the Conrad straße date back to 1905.

The street was known under different callings since its creation:

- Conradstraße, from its creation till 1920;
- Ulica Ossolińskich, from 1920 to 1935. In this case, the path was considered as a southern extension of the Ossoliński avenue in the north;
- Ulica Maksymiliana Piotrowskiego, from 1935 to 1939;
- Conradstraße during the WWII occupation of Bydgoszcz;
- Ulica Maksymiliana Piotrowskiego from 1945.

The current naming relates to Maximilian Piotrowski (1813–1875), a Polish painter, professor at the Academy of Fine Arts of in Königsberg and an ardent Polish patriot. Maximilian Piotrowski was born in Bydgoszcz, then Bromberg, at 22 Długa street.

== Main areas and edifices ==
=== Tenements at 2/4 and 3/5, corner with Jagiellońska street ===
1930s, by Wawrzyniec Żbikowski (Nr.3)

Modern architecture (Nr.3/5)

The plots at Nr.2/4 and 3/5 (opposite frontage) have been vacant for several decades after the opening of the street in 1905. They have been registered only in the mid-1930s.

The tenement at Nr.3 had a peculiar destiny once constructed: its owner, Teofil Orłowski, was asked by two entrepreneurs -Kazimierz Orlicz, owner of a furniture factory, and Władysław Żerwicki, director of a printing house- to make the still uninhabited interiors available for an "Exhibition of Decorated Apartments-Furniture and Interior" (Polish: Wystawy Mieszkań Urządzonych. Mebel i wnętrze). The project, unveiled by the city in June 1936, allowed people to visit the entire building furnished and equipped with high-end features from the time. In one month, the show was visited by 20,000 people.

Both ensemble are dramatically different in form:

- Houses at 2–4, mirroring each other, replicate the eclectic architectural style from the late 19th century: transom light doors, pilasters on the elevation, frieze running beneath the gable and eyelid dormers;
- Buildings at 3-5 are epitomes of the modernist architecture, as one can find in Bydgoszcz houses by Jan Kossowski for instance. Nr.3's facade displays two symmetric stacks of concrete-and-iron balconies, offset by a slight avant-corps. Nr.5 is distinctive with its staircase located above the main entrance and highlighted by cross-windows.
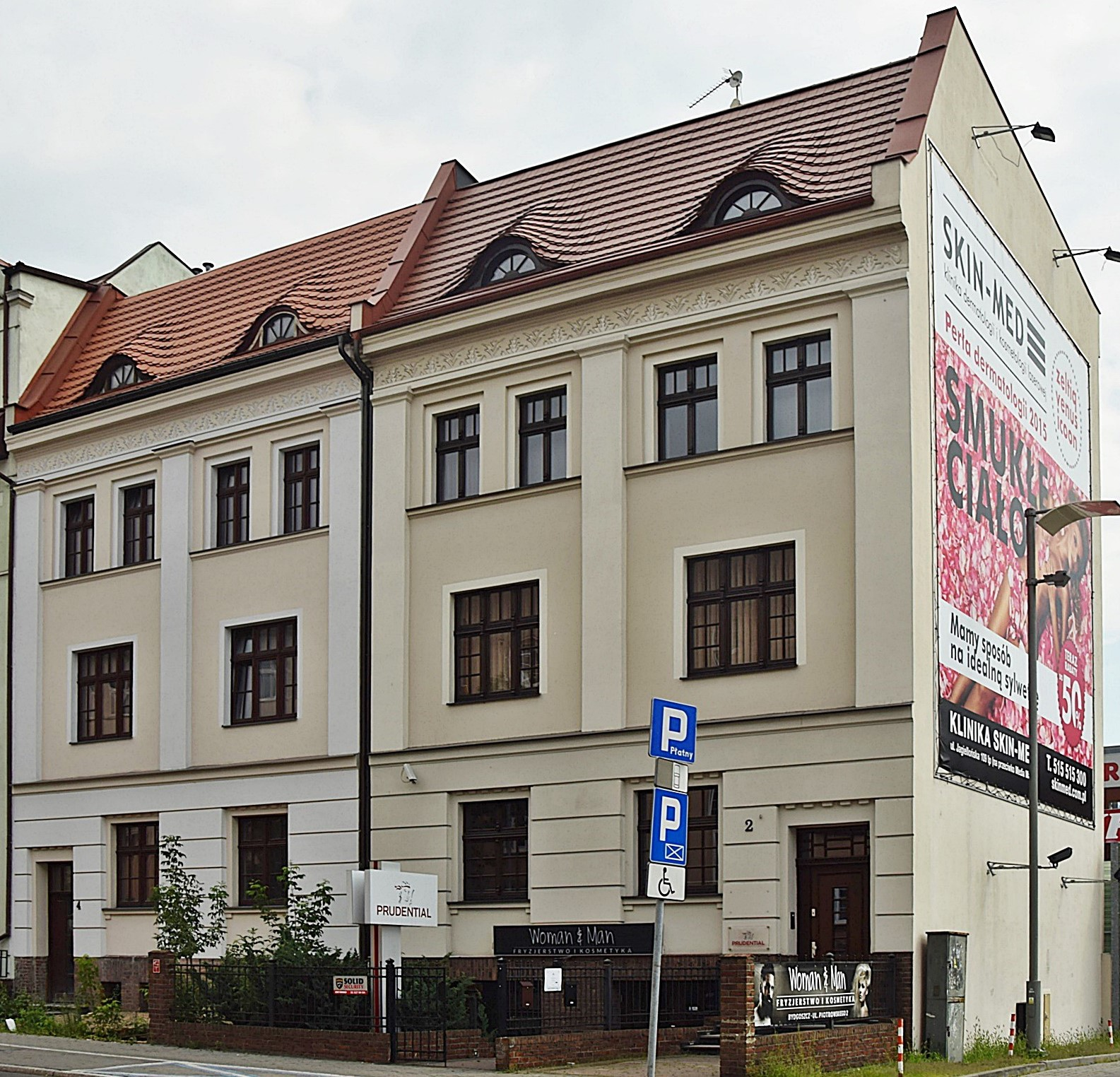
View of tenements at 2/4

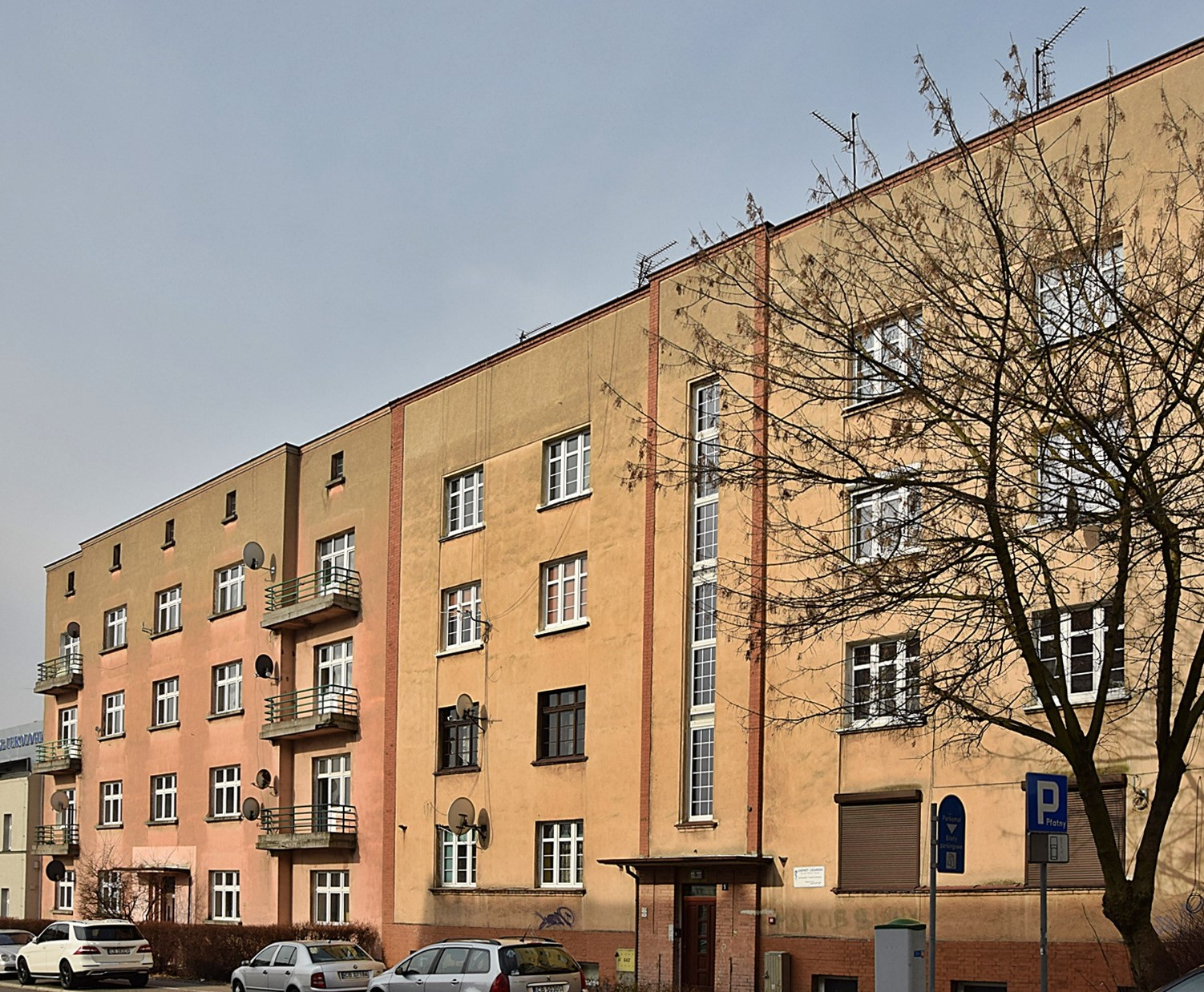
Tenements at 3/5

=== Tenement at 6 ===
1912

Late Art Nouveau, elements of modern architecture

Like the two following buildings on this side of the street (Nr.8 and 10), this tenement was commissioned by an industrial engineer, Willy Krause, in the early 1910s. Currently, the tenement houses an English language school, International House Bydgoszcz.

The balanced facade displays two symmetric avant-corps topped by round bay windows. On each side, the elevation is crowned by a triangular gable. One can notice the adorned portal with kneeling figures and a stuccoed bird on the pediment. Furthermore, various vegetal motifs are scattered along the building.

The frontage, Art Nouveau related, is however strongly influenced by modernist features (long vertical lines with very few curved shapes).

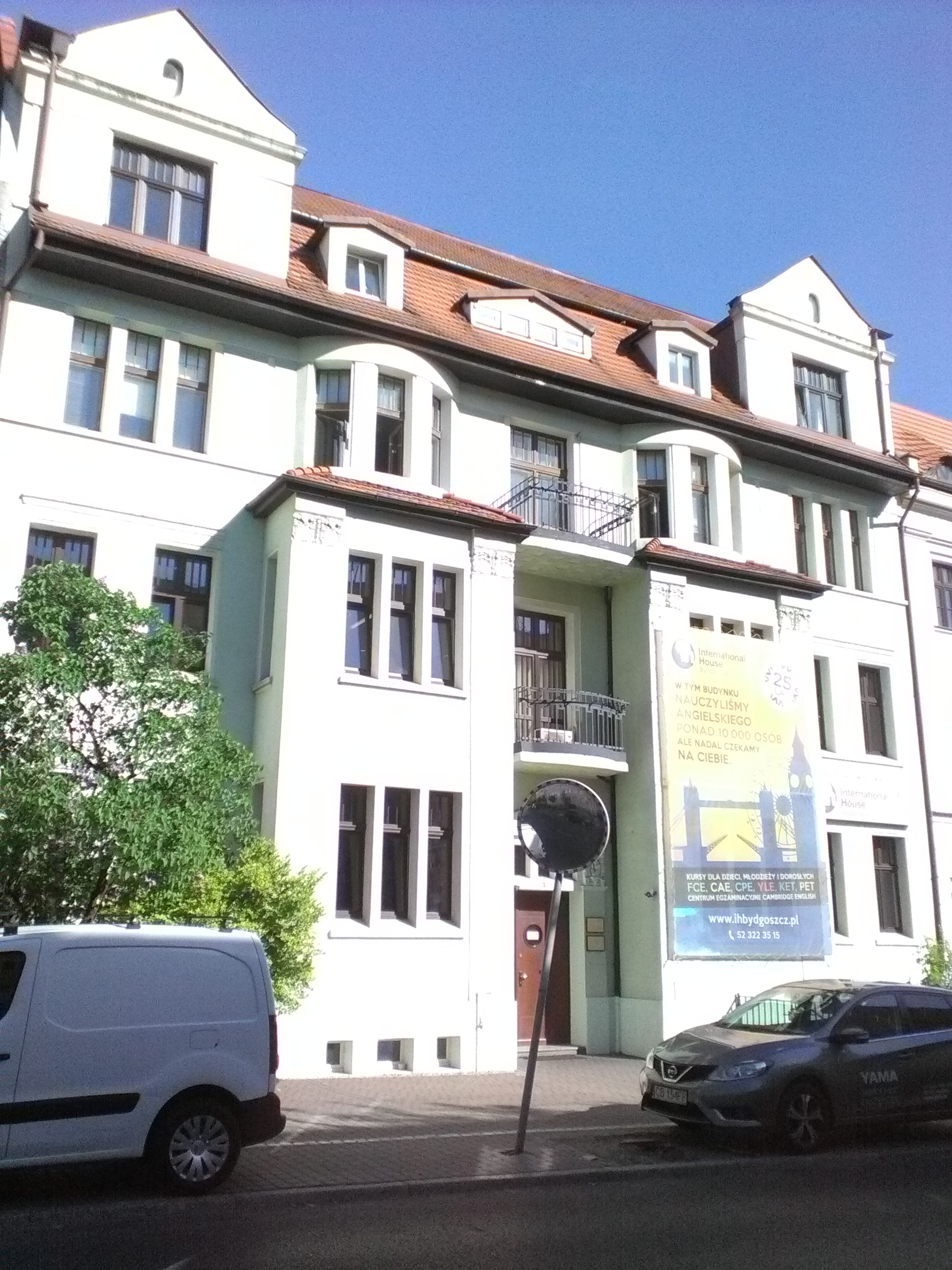
Main elevation on the street

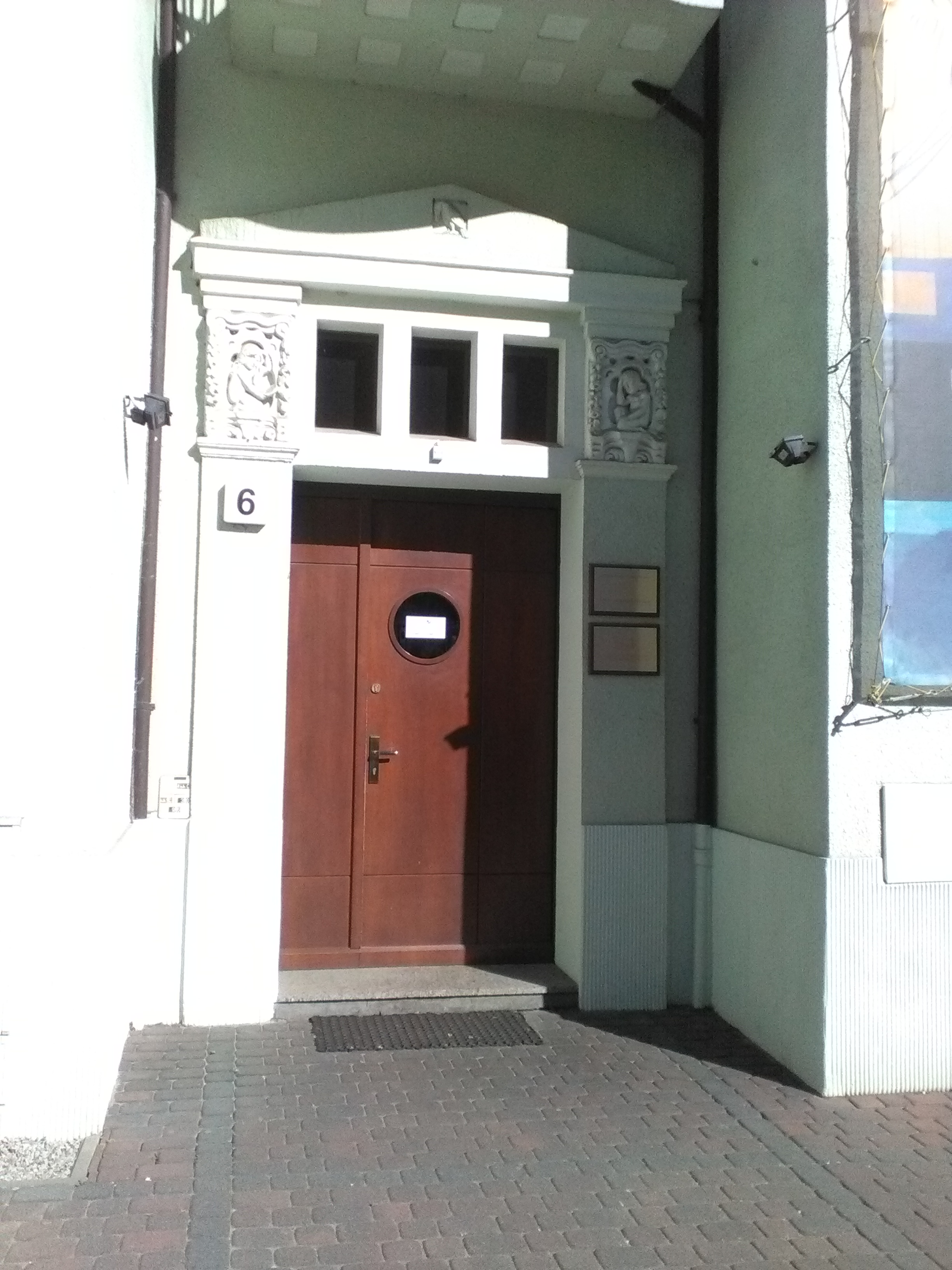
Entrance door

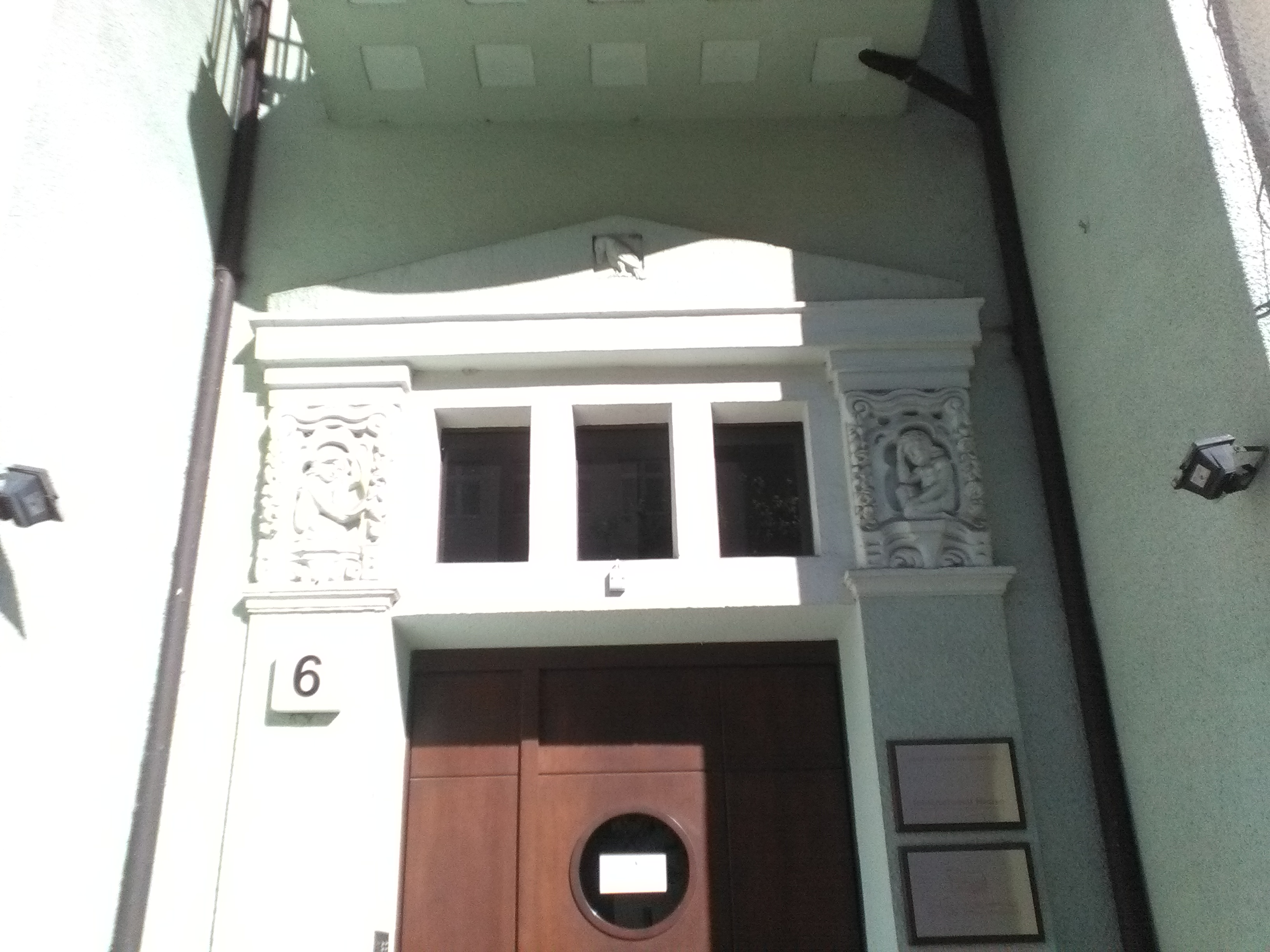
Details of the transom light

=== Willy Krause tenement at 8 ===
1911-1913, by Fritz Weidner

Late Art Nouveau, elements of modern architecture

Willy Krause, an industrial engineer, owned several buildings in the Conradstraße: they are those at today's Nr.6/10. He lived in the present tenement at Nr.8, then Conradstraße 4

The facade, refurbished in 2022, boasts loggias, a large avant-corps on the left side, an elaborate entrance (with mullion lights) and the brick remnants of the front fencing.

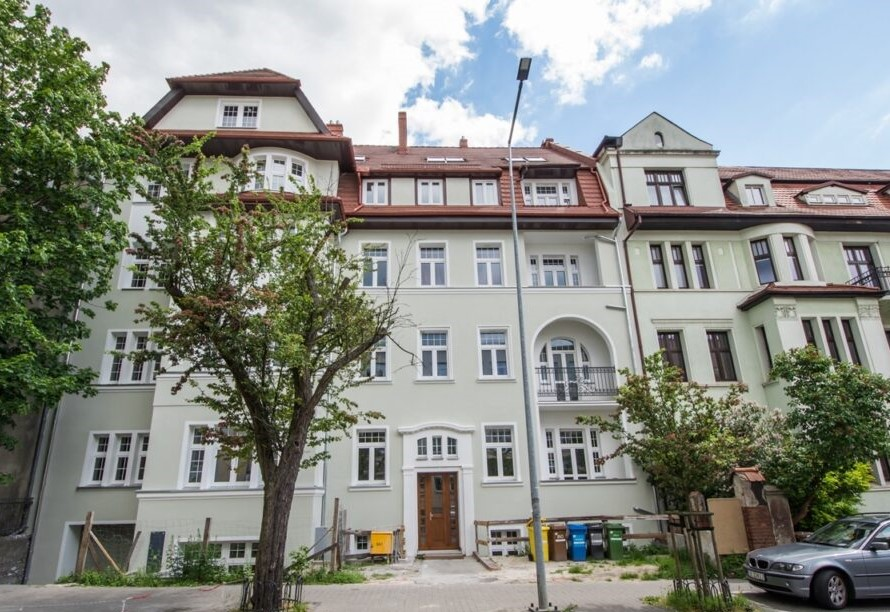
Renovated facade

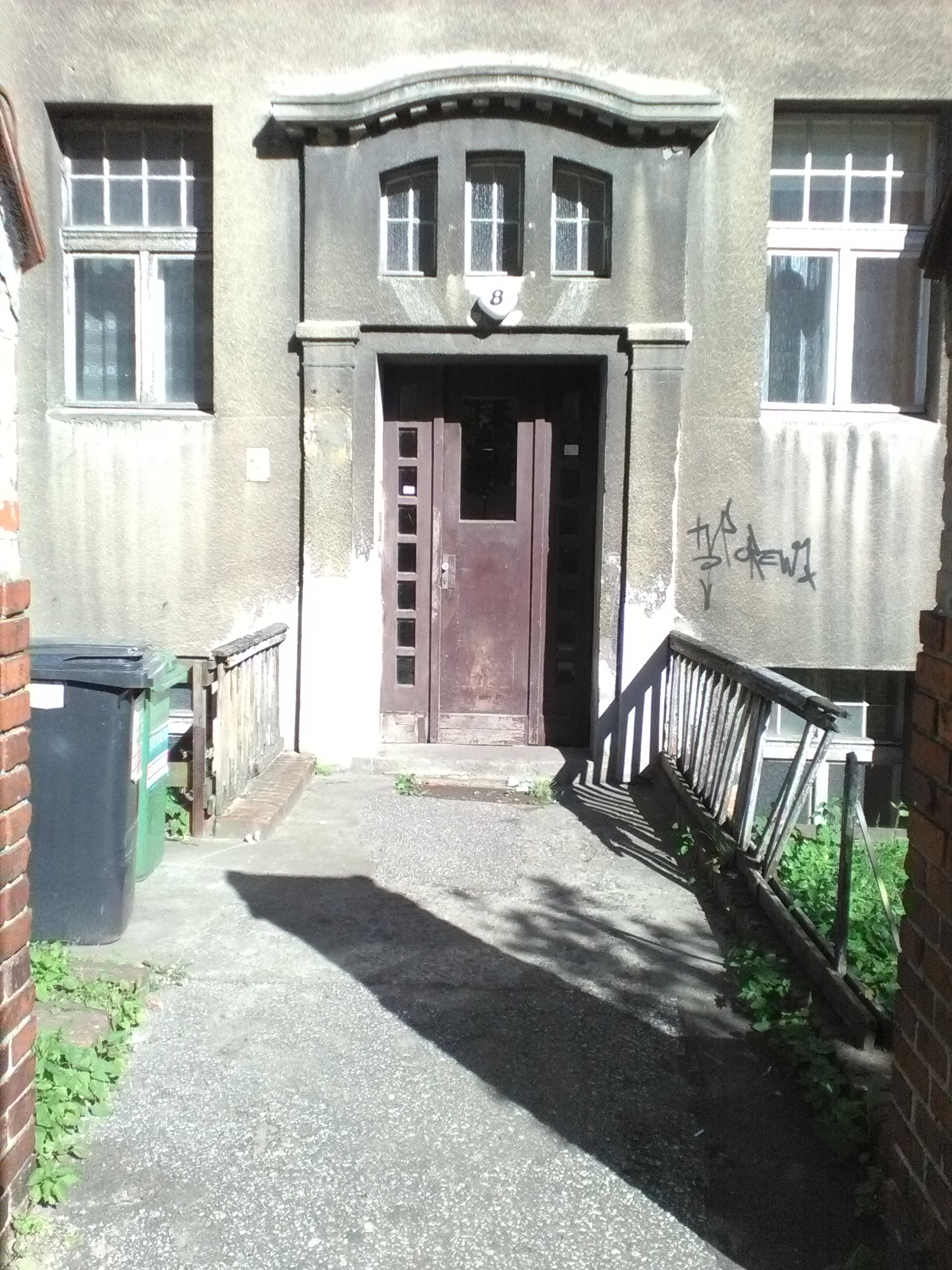
View of the portal entrance (before renovation)

=== Tenement at 10 ===
1910-1912, by Gustaw Rudolf and Oskar Goltz

Late Art Nouveau, elements of modern architecture

This building is the third one that Willy Krause commissioned and owned till the end of the First World War.

Unlike the Nos.6 and 8, the facade exhibits very few Art Nouveau motifs, most of them faded with time. An archive picture from 1913, can nonetheless provide a glimpse of the various details included on the elevation.

Are still notable:

- the wrought iron fencing, closed by carved posts;
- the main entrance door, comprising festoons, transom light and a heavy stucco-decorated pediment.
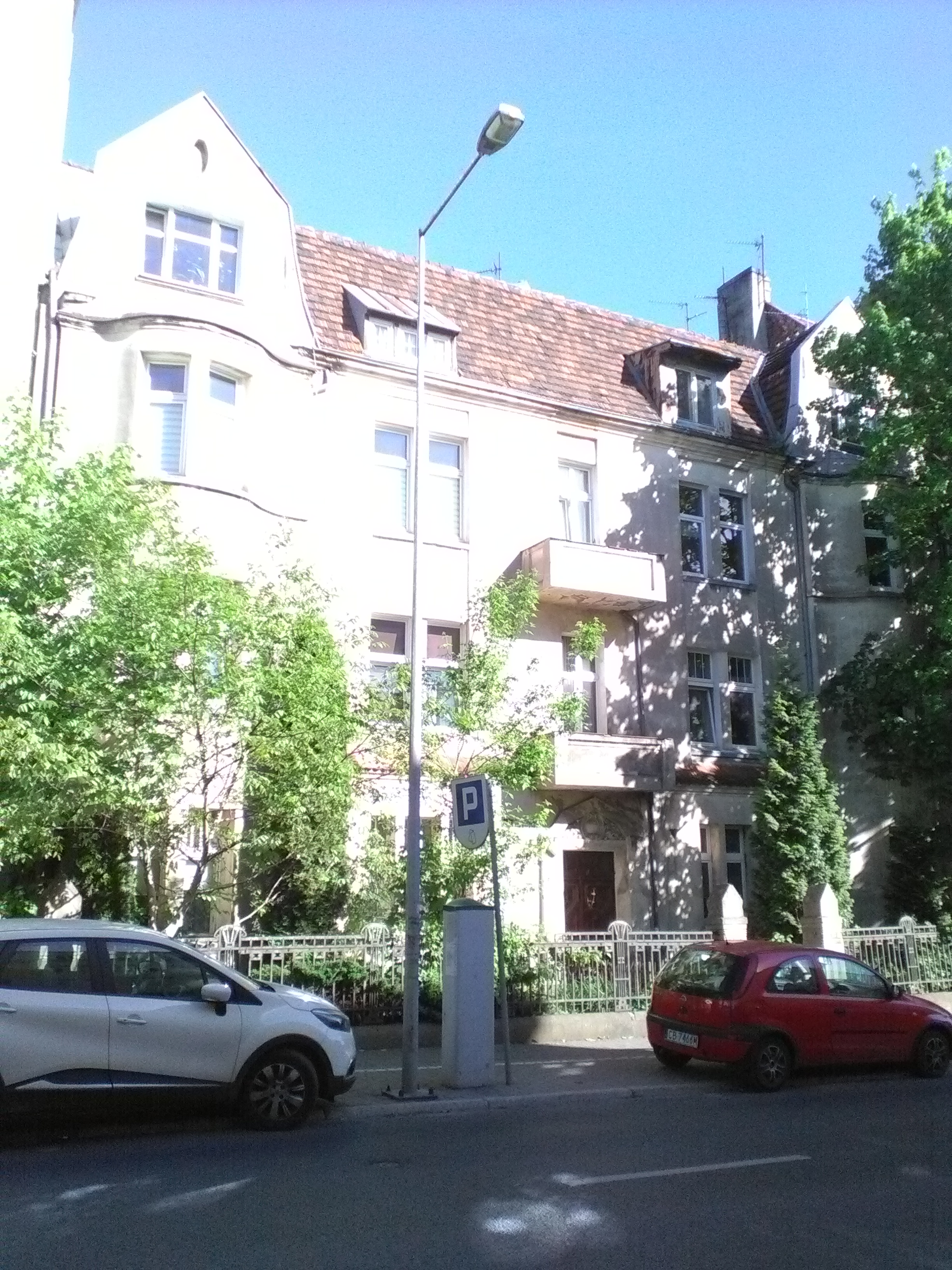
Current view from the street

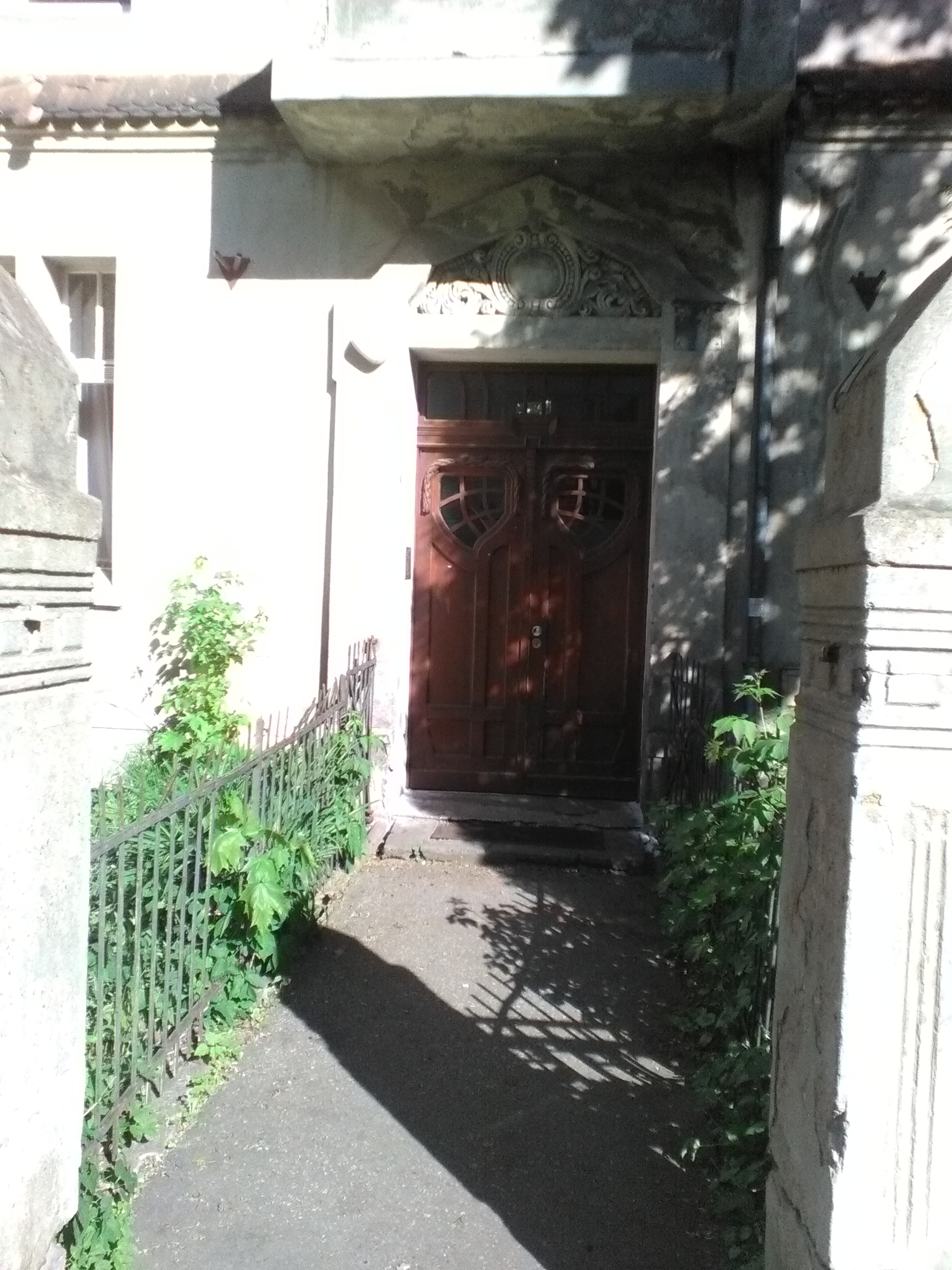
Detail of the portal entrance

=== Chamber of Craft and Entrepreneurship at 11 ===
The institution is a social and professional organization of self-governance which aims at supporting the development of craft and small manufacturing, together with gathering guilds and cooperatives of craftsmen from Kuyavian-Pomeranian Voivodeship.

The association was born in 1848, covering at the time Bromberg region which included the main cities: Bydgoszcz, Inowrocław, Gniezno and Piła. In 1920, the Chamber of Crafts in Bydgoszcz embraced 5 districts: Bydgoszcz, Chodzież, Nakło nad Notecią, Gniezno and Inowrocław. In 1946, the Chamber co-organized the Pomeranian Industry, Craft and Trade Exhibition in Bydgoszcz (Polish: Pomorska Wystawa Przemysłu, Rzemiosła i Handlu w Bydgoszczy), as part of the celebration of the 600th anniversary of Bydgoszcz. This event aroused great interest in the country and abroad. The years 1945-1950 were a period of intense work for the Chamber, helping repatriates and those who suffered from WWII. The seat of the Chamber was located at that time at 10 Jagiellońska street, in a building owned by the Bydgoszcz guild.

Nowadays, the association runs the Bydgoszcz Craft and Entrepreneurship Schools ensemble, which includes a vocational school, a supplementary technical school and a general secondary school for adults. Since 2009, the Chamber has also been operating the Continuing Education Center of Craft and Entrepreneurship in Bydgoszcz.

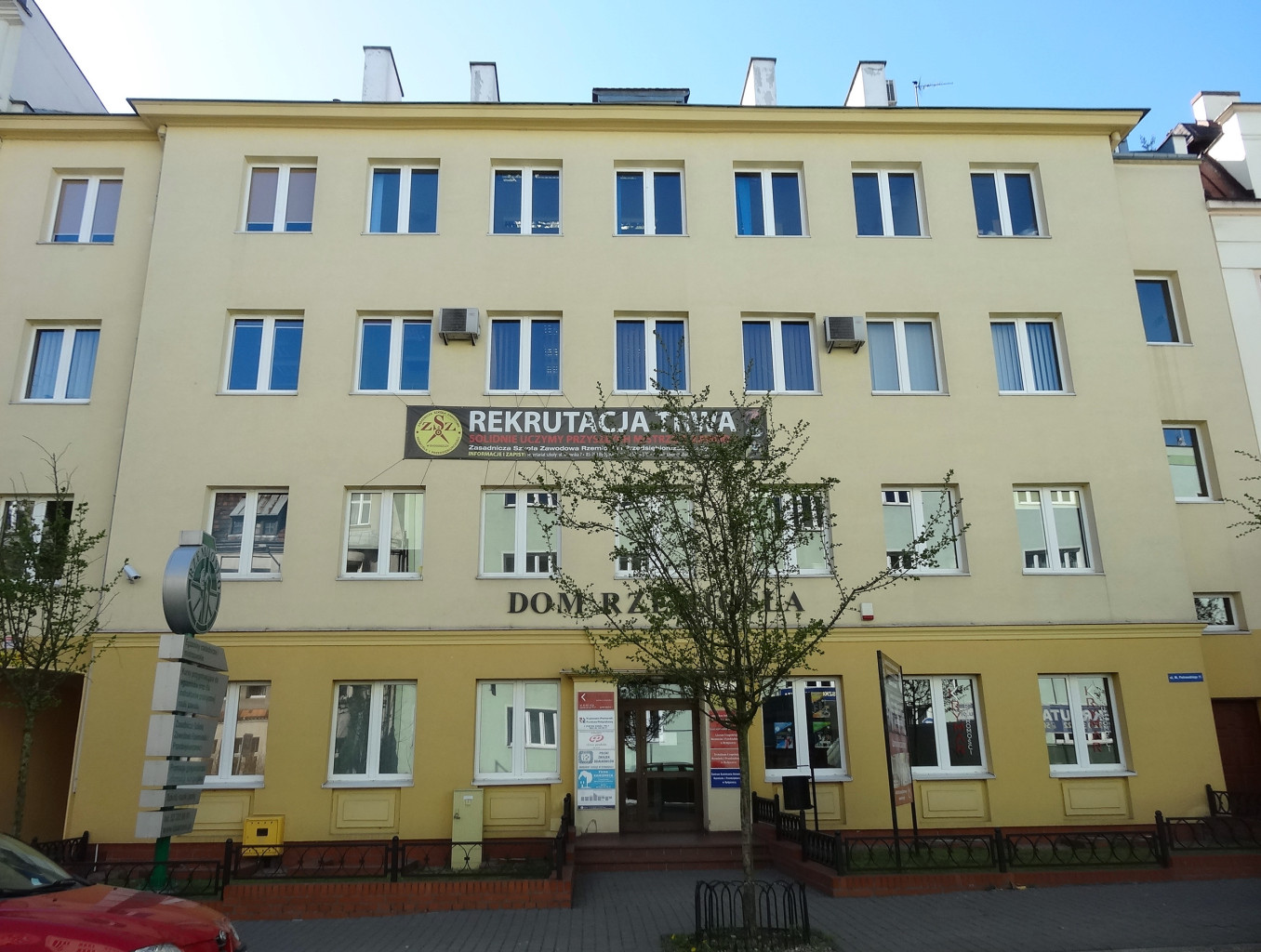
Current view from the street

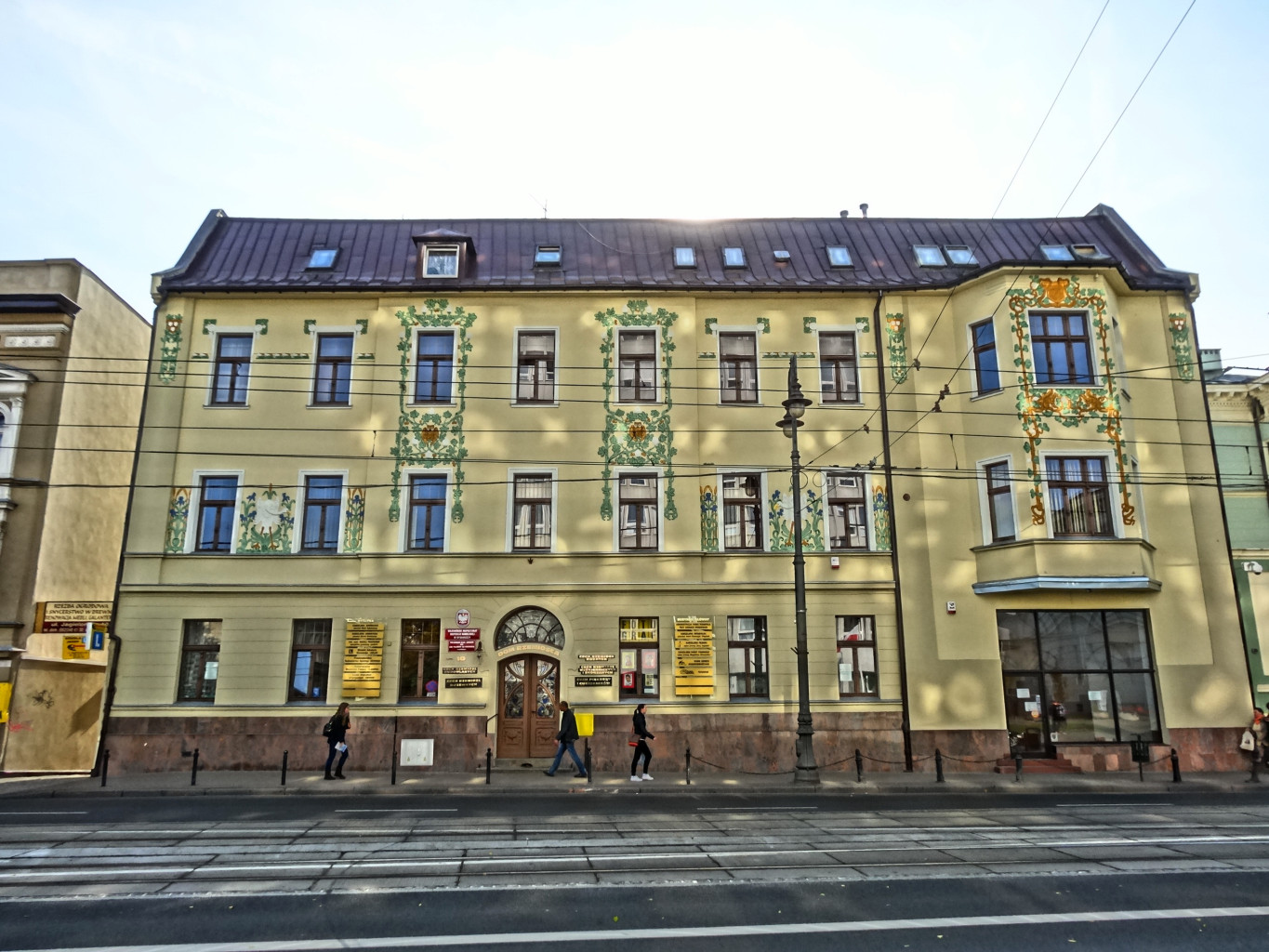
Previous seat of the chamber at 10 Jagiellońska street

=== Tenement at 13 ===
1920s, by Bogdan Raczkowski

Modern architecture

It was the first building realised by Bogdan Raczkowski (1888–1939) in Bydgoszcz. The commission came from the city, so as to house municipal administrative offices (Polish: Zarząd Miasta Bydgoszczy).

The symmetrical four-storey facade displays an avant-corps with channeled pilasters, topped by a large roof strip decorated with rosettes. The initial design planned to have seven stone vases placed on the top, but it did not happen.

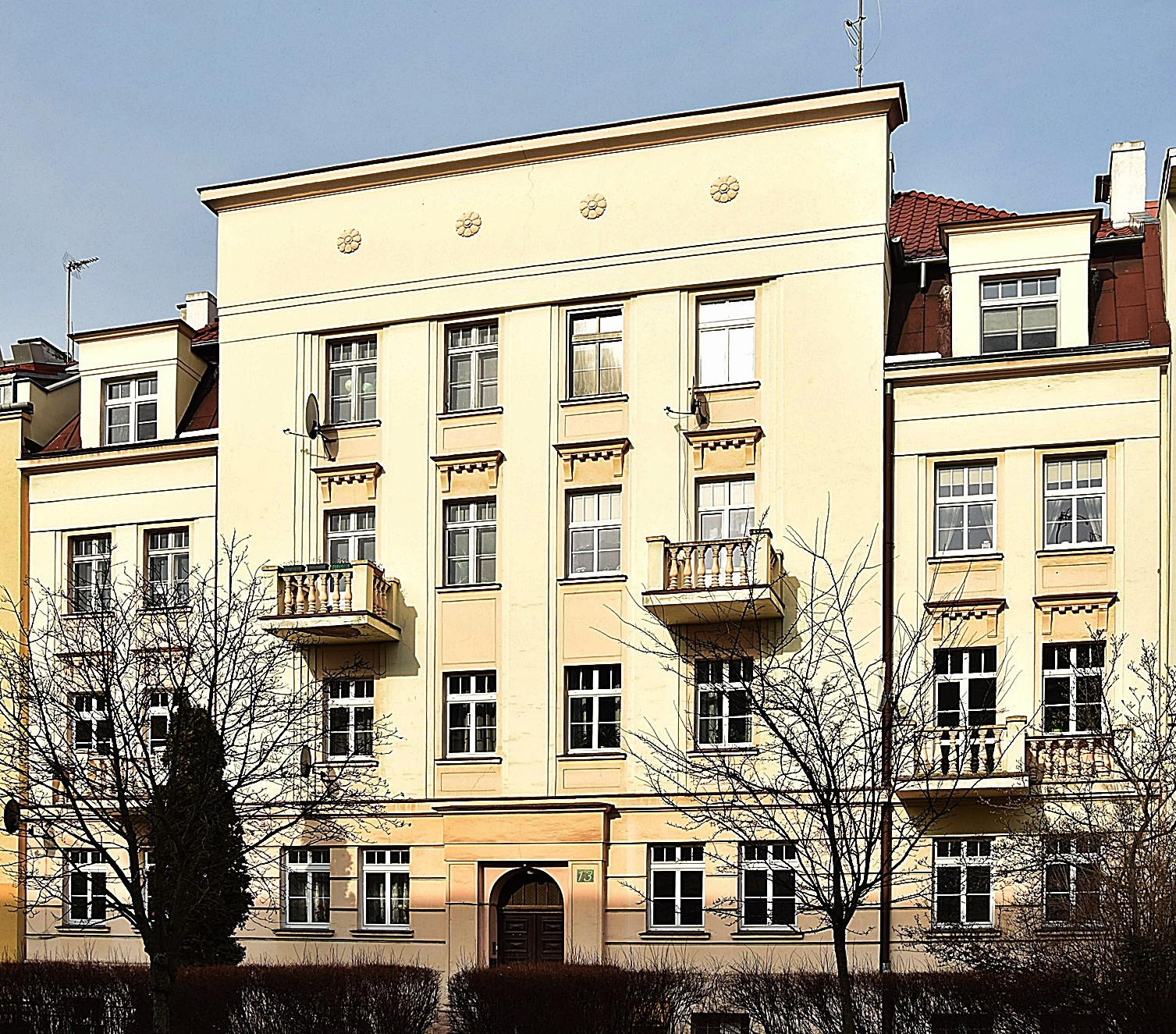
Main frontage on the street

=== Tenement at 15 ===
1906-1908

Late Art Nouveau, elements of modern architecture

The first years of the development of Piotrowskiego avenue led to a change to the house numberings: however, the building seems to have been ordered by Franz Schröder in the early 1900s and as such is one of the oldest in the street.

Although erected during the Art Nouveau period, the facade style leans more on the side of the modernism, with the preponderance of vertical lines across the elevation. Some typical Art nouveau vegetal motifs can yet be noted with the presence of a frieze and the adornment of the main entrance frame door.

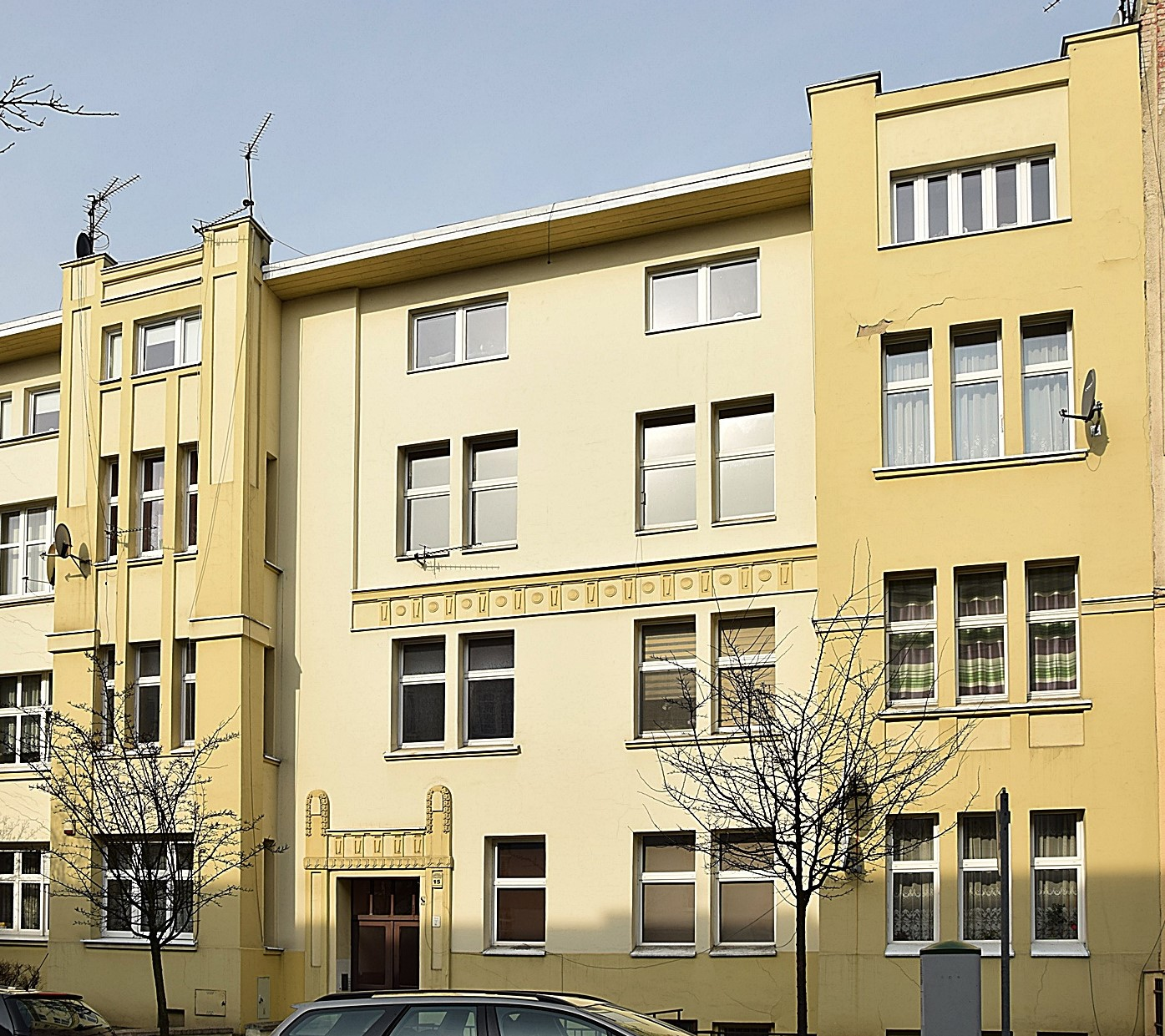
Current view from the street

=== Tenement at 16 ===
1930s

Modern architecture

The same way the plots at Nr.2/4 and 3/5 have been vacant for several decades after the opening of the street in 1905, the building at Nr.16 was only erected in the 1930s.

The style recalls other houses in the street (Nr.3/5), but also echoes the same type of realizations that occurred in Bydgoszcz at that time, among others:

- the works by Jan Kossowski at 41 20 Stycznia 1920 Street (1936);
- the villa by Józef Trojański at 65 Chodkiewicza Street (1934);
- Edward Stecewicz's villa at 9 Ossoliński avenue (1927–1931).

The facade displays the well-known pattern of two symmetric facades, separated by a slight avant-corps, where is located the staircase highlighted by cross-windows above the entrance. One can additionally underline the nice brick work around the door frame rendering a tunnel perspective.

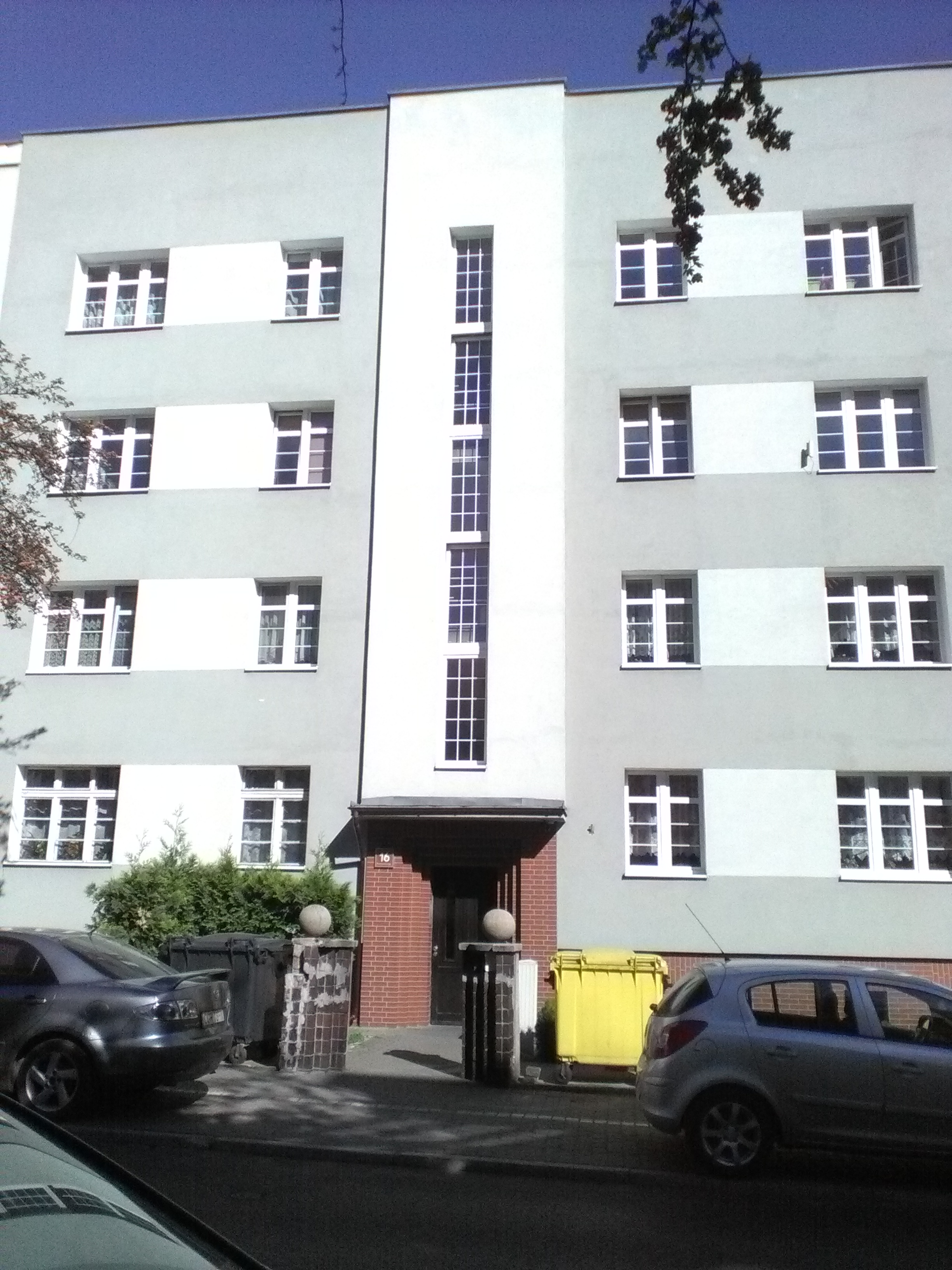
Facade on the street

=== Tenement at 17 ===
1906-1908

Early modernism

The building was commissioned by Lüdtke in the mid-1900s, one of the two oldest tenement in this street; at that time, it was registered at 13 Conradstraße.

The facade is unbalanced by the presence of an avant-corps on its right flank. Few other details are noticeable apart from the thin elongated pilasters on the frontage and the small fenced frontyard still preserved.

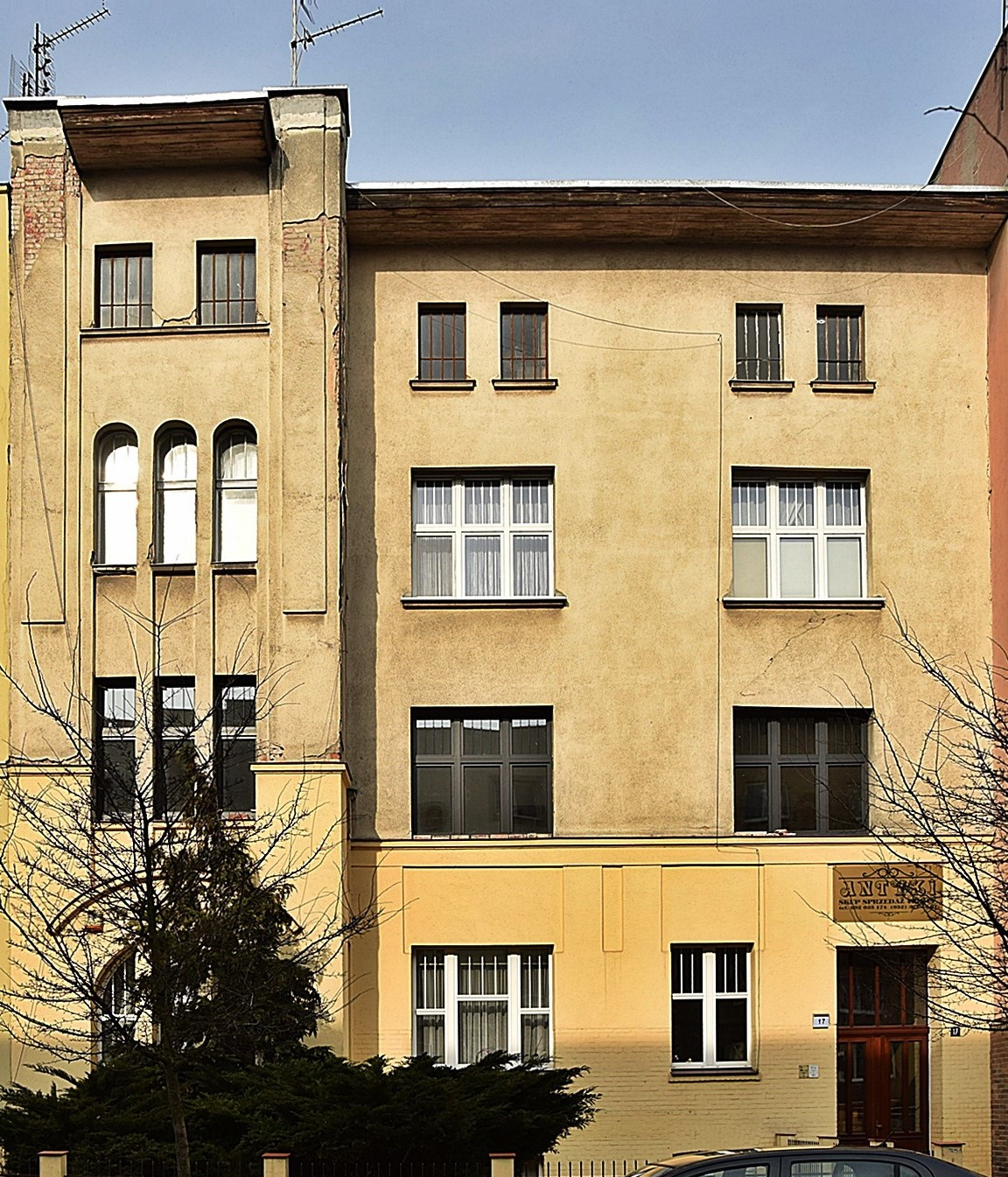
View of the main elevation

=== Tenement at 18 ===
1930s

Modern architecture

At the image of other buildings in the street (3-5 and 15), this tenement, built in the 1930s, reproduces the modernist style en vogue in this period in Bydgoszcz.

One can appreciate the two symmetric facades, separated by a large avant-corps comprising not only the staircase, but also windows. The stairway is highlighted by two thin round top cross-windows. One can additionally underline the roofed main entrance.

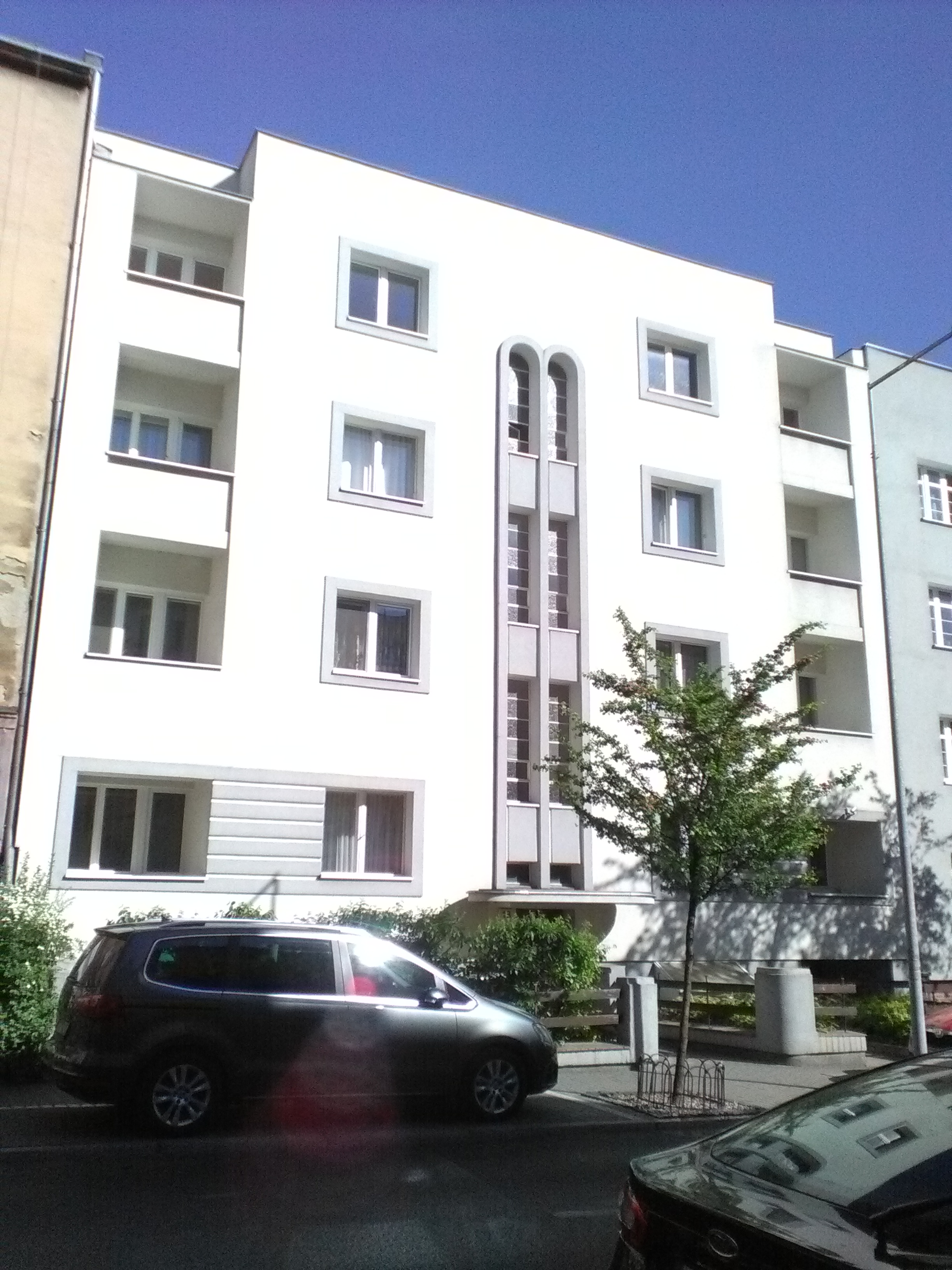
Facade on the street

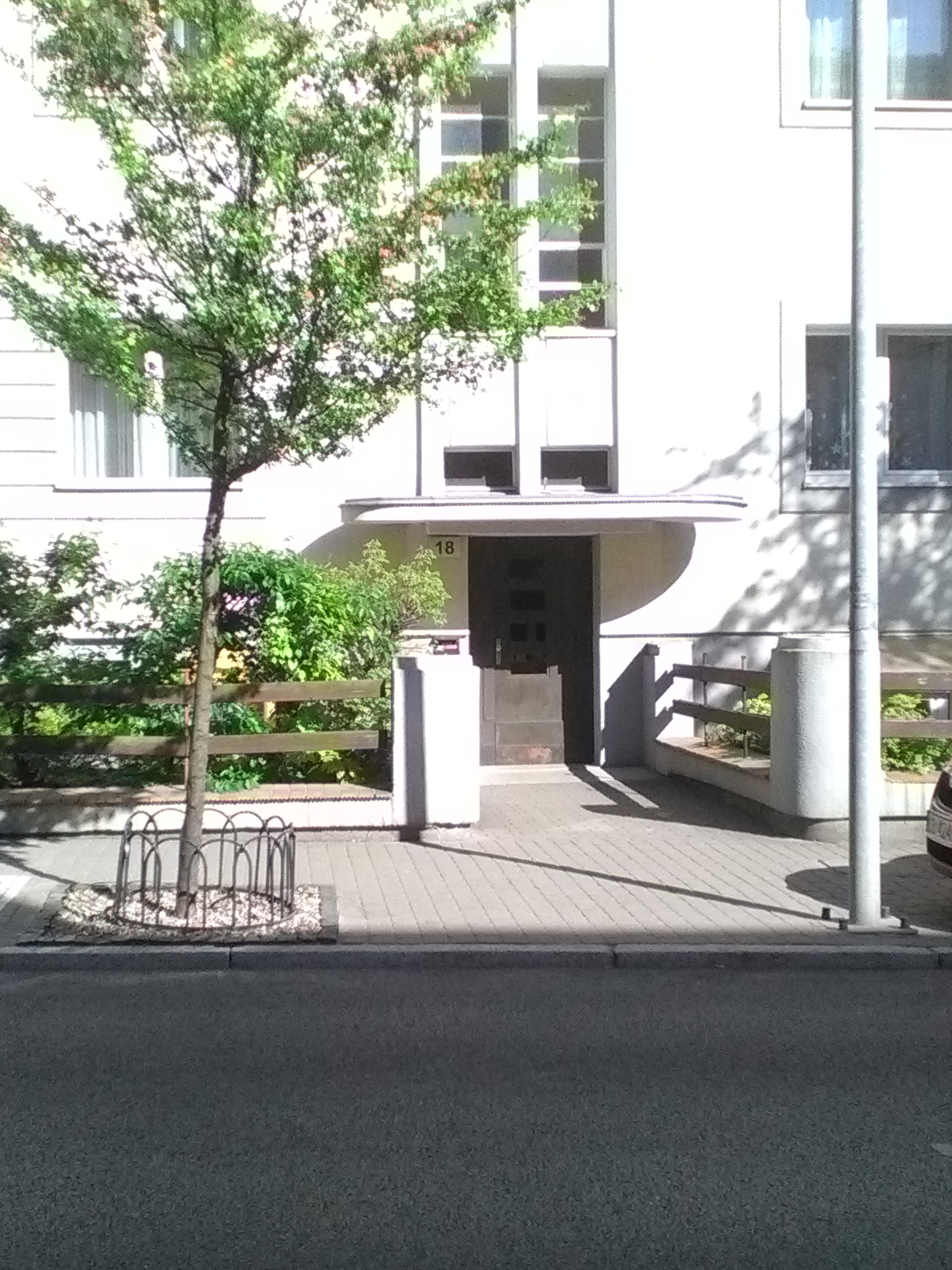
Detail of the main entrance

=== Tenement at 20/20a, corner with Markwarta street ===
1930s,

Modern architecture

The tenements (Nr.20 onto Piotrowskiego, Nr.20a onto Markwarta) have been the last ones to be erected in the street, completing the connection with Markwarta street in the 1930s.

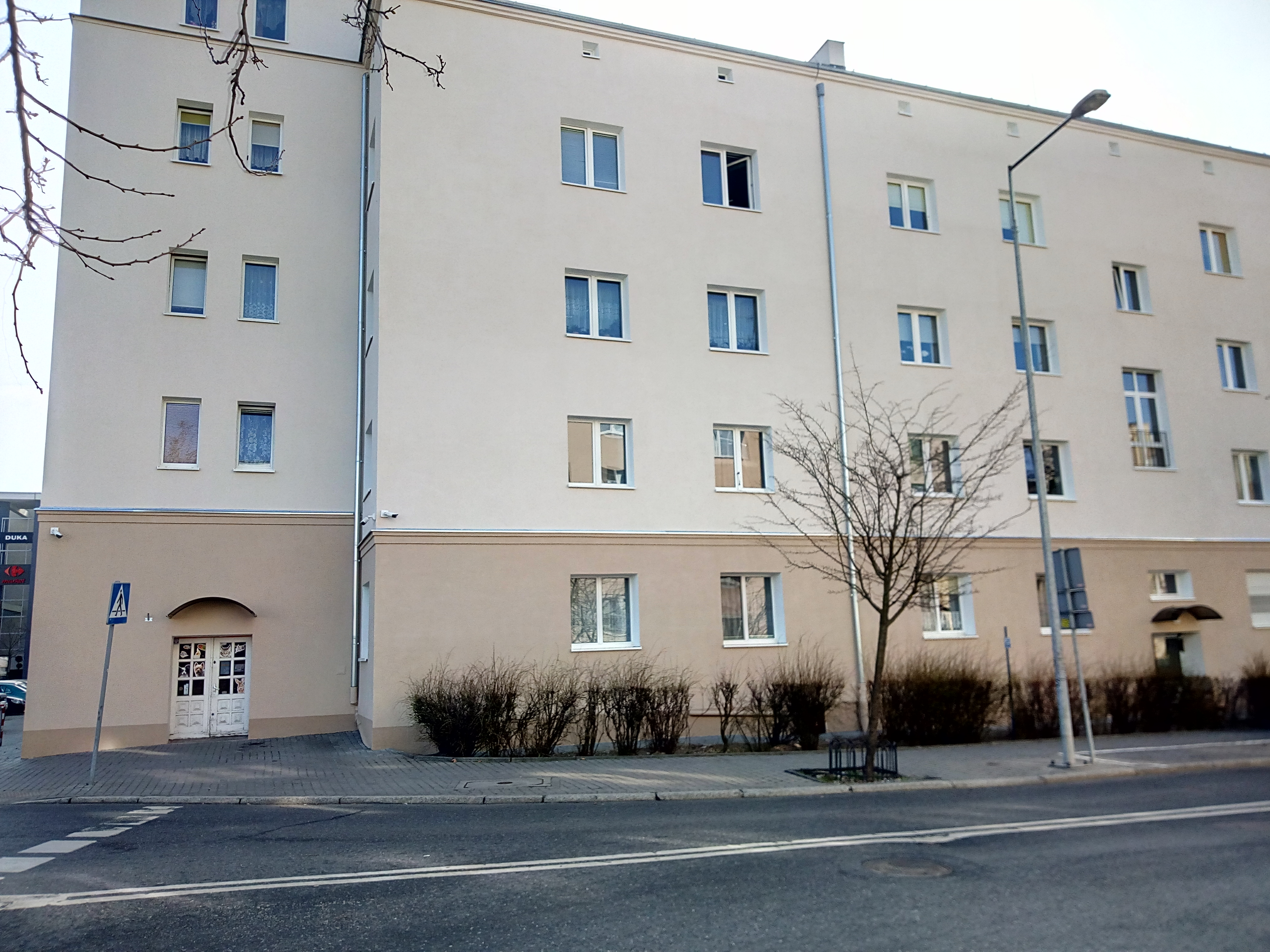
View from the street

=== Ensemble at 19-21 Piotrowskiego/20-22 Markwarta street ===
1930s, by Jan Kossowski

Modern architecture

The construction of this series of tenement spanned several years. However, since the commissioner Józef Piecek, an engineer, and the architect Jan Kossowski were at the origin of the entire project, the ensemble kept its consistency.

Buildings at 21 Piotrowskiego-20 Markwarta have been erected between 1933 and 1938, while the one at Nr.19 was completed in 1936–1937.

The only break of homogeneity in the lot are half-moon balconies stacked over the main entrance at 21 Piotrowskiego, similar to the elevation at 41 20 Stycznia 1920 Street. The facade, corner-shaped, recalls the same pattern designed by Kossowski at 5 Swiętej Trojcy street.

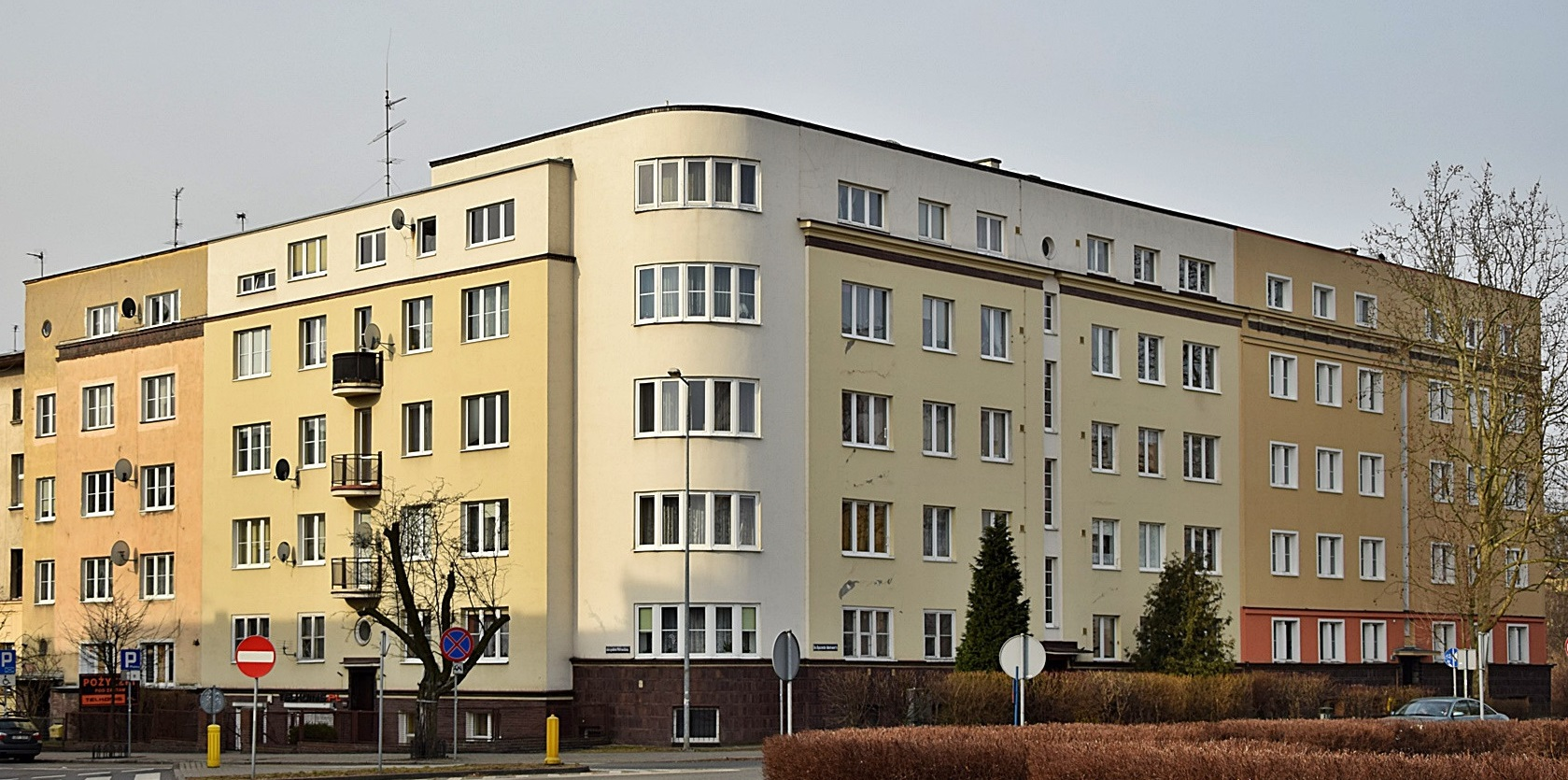
View of the ensemble at 19-21 Piotrowskiego/20-22 Markwarta

== See also ==
- Bydgoszcz
- Markwarta street in Bydgoszcz
- Jagiellońska street in Bydgoszcz
- Maximilian Piotrowski
- Bydgoszcz Polish architects after WWI
- Functionalist architecture Poland
