= Sebastian Piotrowski =

Polish-German footballer

Personal information
- Date of birth: 5 October 1990 (age 36)
- Place of birth: Saarbrücken, Germany
- Position: Forward

Senior career*
Years	Team	Apps	(Gls)
2010–2011	1. FC Saarbrücken II	25	(8)
2011–2013	FC Homburg	13	(1)
2013	SVN Zweibrücken	9	(0)
2013–2014	SV Elversberg	5	(0)
2017	SV Saar 05 Saarbrücken	10	(1)
Total		62	(10)
- * Club domestic league appearances and goals

Sebastian Piotrowski (born 5 October 1990) is a Polish-German former professional footballer who played as a forward.

He changed career and became an Augustinian Chorherr in the abbey of Parring. He took his vows in 2004.
