= Piotrów =

Piotrów may refer to the following places:

- Piotrów, Piotrków County in Łódź Voivodeship (central Poland)
- Piotrów, Poddębice County in Łódź Voivodeship (central Poland)
- Piotrów, Kielce County in Świętokrzyskie Voivodeship (south-central Poland)
- Piotrów, Ostrowiec County in Świętokrzyskie Voivodeship (south-central Poland)
- Piotrów, Białobrzegi County in Masovian Voivodeship (east-central Poland)
- Piotrów, Sochaczew County in Masovian Voivodeship (east-central Poland)
- Piotrów, Greater Poland Voivodeship (west-central Poland)
- Piotrów, Lubusz Voivodeship (west Poland)
