= Maximilian Piotrowski =

Polish painter and professor (1813–1875)

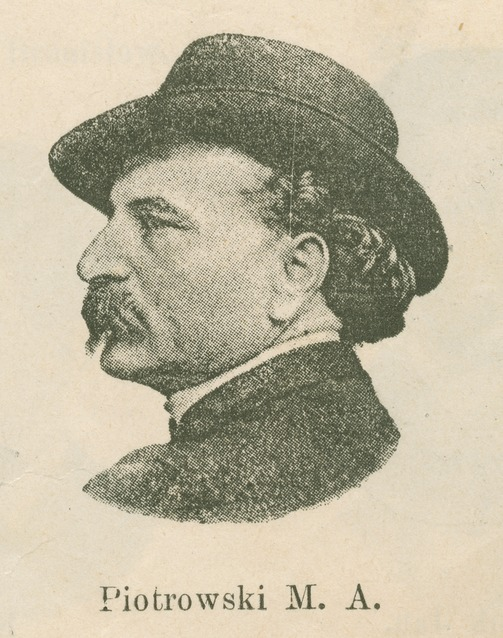
- Maximilian Piotrowski
- Born: Maksymilian Antoni Piotrowski; June 8, 1813; Bromberg, Kingdom of Prussia
- Died: November 29, 1875 (aged 62); Königsberg, German Empire
- Resting place: Starofarny Cemetery in Bydgoszcz
- Occupation: Painter

Maximilian (Maksymilian) Antoni Piotrowski (1813–1875) was a Polish painter and professor at the Academy of Fine Arts in Kaliningrad. Additionally, he was a Polish patriot who took part in the national uprisings of the time.

== Life ==
Maximilian Antoni Piotrowski was born on June 8, 1813, in Bromberg, then in Prussia. His father Andrzej owned a bakery in the old town, at 22 Długa street. Andrzej's wife Teresa née Baranowska and himself moved to the city a year before Maximilian's birth, relocating from the nearby village of Koronowo. Maximilian spent his youth in his hometown, under the first decades of Prussian occupation.

After graduating from high school, Maximilian moved to Berlin at the age of 20 (1833) to study painting at the Academy of Fine Arts. In 1835, he studied historical painting under the direction of Wilhelm Hensel. Having completed his studies in Berlin in 1838, he went on an artistic tour through Germany. He visited Düsseldorf where he was taught by Friedrich Wilhelm Schadow. Schadow was a member of the Nazarene movement aspiring to revive spirituality in art, with a return to Quattrocento-like features, thus differentiating from the pseudo-classicism then in vogue in Europe. Once back to the German capital, he received the first prize of the academy.

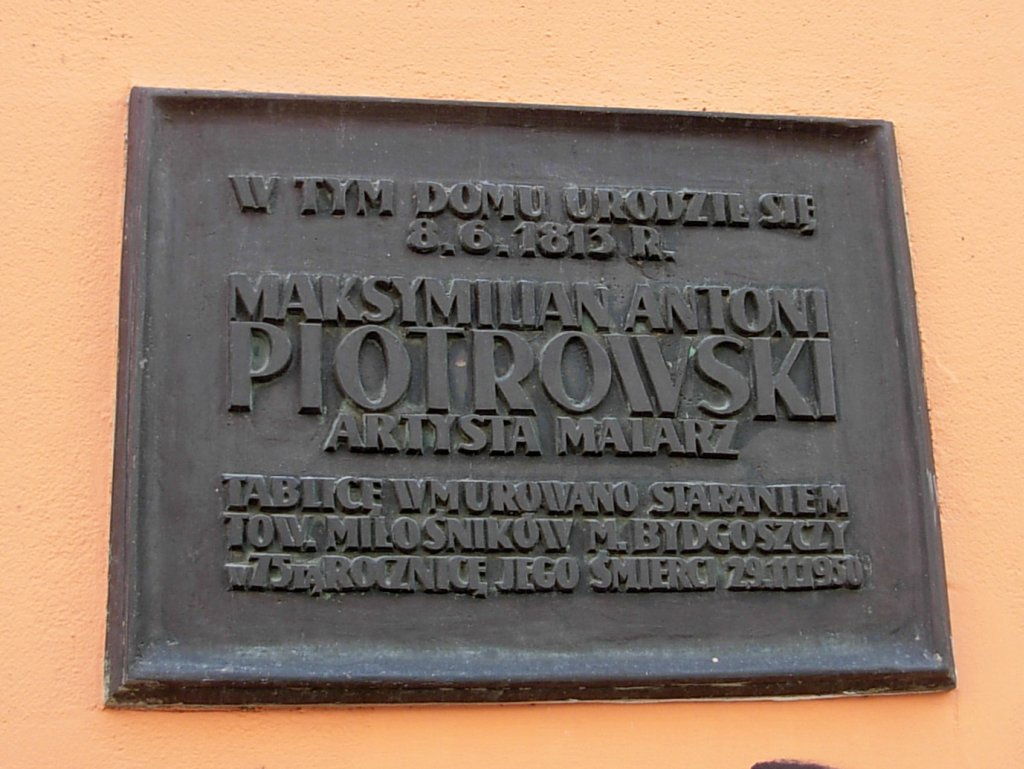
Commemorative plaque at 22 Długa street, native home of Maximilian Piotrowski

To achieve his artistic education, Maximilian traveled in the fall of 1842 to Italy. He first stayed in Rome where he had the opportunity to meet another member of the Nazarene movement, Johann Friedrich Overbeck. In spring of 1843, Maximilian embarked upon a journey through the Italian country. Fascinated by Italian landscapes, he painted many scenes depicting daily life, together with sentimental-romantic and religious compositions; such works were later exhibited in Berlin at one of his exhibitions (1844).

After Italy, he stayed in Munich to establish artistic contacts: accordingly, he met Peter von Cornelius and in particular Wilhelm von Kaulbach, an outstanding painter of historical scenes.

In early 1844, he moved back to Berlin, concluding his studies and staying there until 1847. During this period, Maximilian had a contract to work with a group on a monumental historical painting depicting an episode of the Anglo-Afghan War, commissioned by William Empton. However, the demise of the latter put to a sudden end of the project. The draft work was only at a preparatory stage based on cardboard material- be that as it may, the unfinished work was displayed at an 1846 exhibition in Berlin. The author kept from this project a drawing, Wounded english soldier (Polish: ranny zolnierz angielski) that would be exhibited in 1925. After this unexpected ending, Piotrowski left the field of historical painting to turn to Dolce Far Niente subjects.

In 1848, in the wake of the Spring of the Nations, he took part in a freedom demonstration in Berlin; he was arrested for it, and soon released. The same year, Maximilian traveled to Prussian Poland and similarly participated in the Greater Poland uprising in Bydgoszcz and Poznań. A group of his drawings are entirely related to these events. Furthermore, Piotrowski's paintings from that period take root from these upheavals.

One can highlight from this period:

- Revolutionary (Polish: Rewolucjonista);
- On the barricades (Polish: Na barykadach);
- Spring of Nations of 1848 (Polish: Wiosna Ludów 1848 roku).

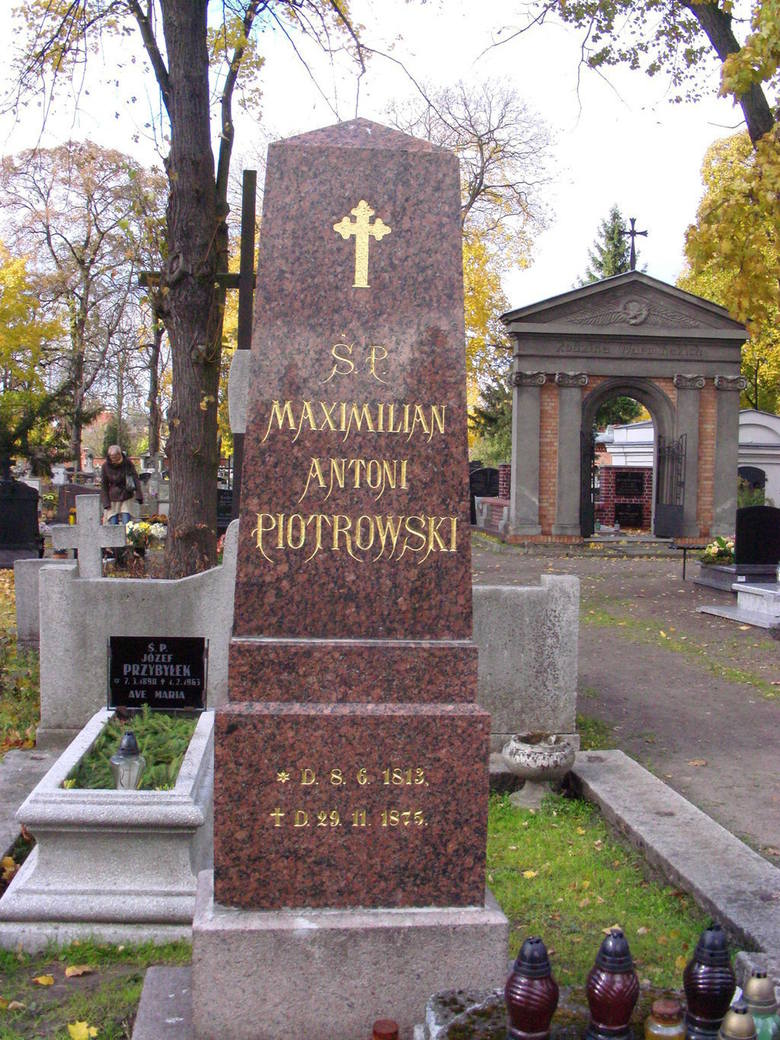
Maximilian Piotrowski tomb in Bydgoszcz

The collapse of the Spring of Nations combined with the lack of opportunities for his artistic development in his homeland compelled him to return to Berlin. However, he did not stay long, as in 1849, he moved to Königsberg (today's Kaliningrad), to be appointed as professor at the Academy of Fine Arts (German: Preussische Akademie der Künste).

In Königsberg, he led the class of ancient plaster drawing for 26 years . In 1853, he decorated a plafond of the Królewiec royal railway station. The middle room ceiling of the waiting room was adorned with an allegory depicting the benefits of the railway for the country. Maximilian also decorated with polychromes the auditorium of the University of Königsberg, between 1861 and 1872 together with G. Graf. From 1836 onwards, Piotrowski started to be present in many European exhibitions in Dresden, Ghent, Leipzig and Paris.

In 1856, Piotrowski sent two paintings to the Kraków exhibition set up by the Kraków Society of Friends of Fine Arts: the Nativity of Christ (Polish: Narodzenie Chrystusa) and Invitation to a rendez vous (Polish: Zaproszenie na rendez vous). It was his first participation in the Society's exhibitions and was renewed almost annually. He traveled as well to Kraków via Warsaw and Częstochowa. In 1858, he exhibited the Death of Wanda (Polish: Śmierć Wandy) at the Kraków's event: the painting brought him great fame and recognition among Polish and German critics. In 1864, he exhibited in Berlin his work Marie Antoinette with the Dauphin in the Temple prison (Polish: Maria Antonina z Delfinem w więzieniu w Temple), which was similarly shown in Krakow three years later. During the 1863 January Uprising, Maximilian studio in Königsberg housed local Polish insurgents. A few of his paintings have been inspired by this series of events of this year.

Piotrowski died on November 29, 1875, in Königsberg; his body was transferred to Bydgoszcz and buried inside the family crypt of the Staro Farny Cemetery in Grunwaldzka street.

== Works ==
Maximilian Piotrowski painted about 200 paintings in his lifetime. In Berlin, he was influenced by the historical sentimentality of the Düsseldorf school. His paintings were highly valued by his contemporaries, which was a reason of his appointment as a professor at the Academy of Fine Arts in Königsberg. One of his most famous realizations in this city was the polychrome in the university hall, rendering allegories of philosophy, history and mathematics.

Active during the Biedermeier period, Maximilian Piotrowski mastered these techniques:

- oil paint;
- pastel;
- watercolor painting;
- tempera painting.

His topics were not only referring to historical scenes, but he additionally represented genre painting, religious pictures or portraits. One can cite, among others:

- The Head of a Jew from Thessaloniki (Polish: Głowa Żyda z Salonik), oil paint sketch;
- Raftsmen on the Neman river (Polish: Flisacy na Niemnie), genre scene;
- Louis XV and Madame de Pompadour (Polish: Ludwik XV i pani Pompadour) or the Death of Wanda, historical compositions;
- Artist's self-portrait with a palette (Polish: Autoportret z paletą).

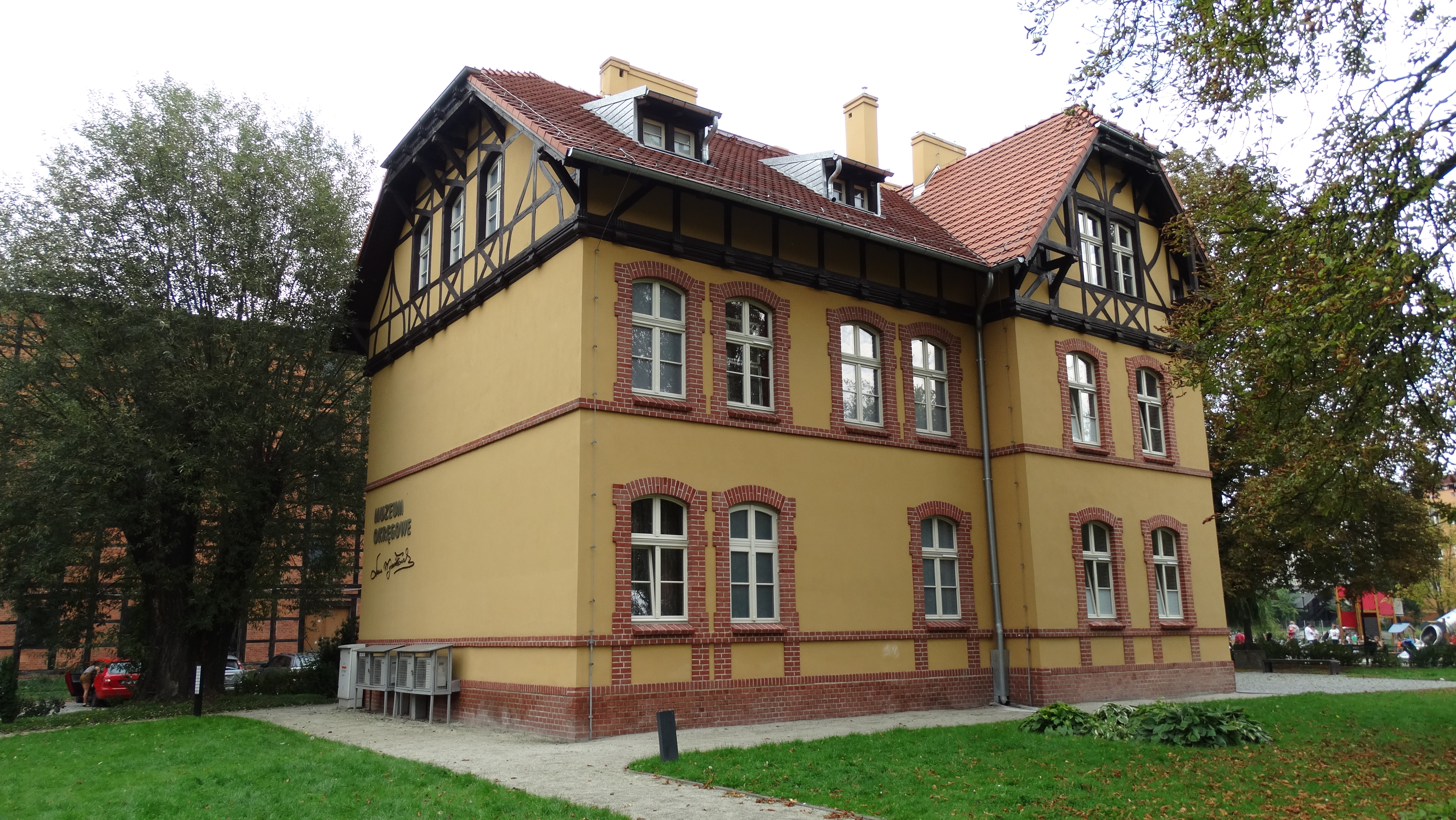
One of the buildings of the District Museum of Bydgoszcz

Works by Piotrowski are dispersed among international collections. In Poland, one can highlight the following paintings:

- The Separation of Marie Antoinette from the young Dauphin the Temple prison (Polish: Rozłączenie Marii Antoniny z młodym Delfinem w więzieniu w Temple) exhibited at the National Museum of Poznań;
- Death of Wanda at the National Museum of Kraków.

Most of the painter's works are displayed in District Museum of Bydgoszcz, i.e. several dozens of artistic items. Some religious paintings can be found in Bydgoszcz churches.

According to Tadeusz Dobrowolski, director of the National Museum in Krakow between 1950 and 1956:

...in the years 1850-1875, Maksymilian Piotrowski was one of the most popular Polish painters and, although he was a professor at a German academy, he felt Polish and for painting motifs he most often turned to his native country.

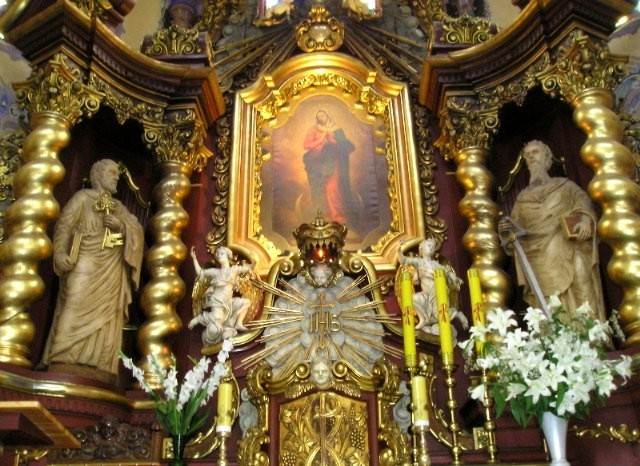
Main altar with Piotrowski's Madonna of the Immaculate Conception- St Peter's and St Paul's Church

The national affiliation of Piotrowski's art was the subject of long disputes between Polish and German experts. The painter himself, living and working in an ethnically foreign environment, never denied his Polish heritage. Among his works are a whole range of Polish topics, such as Before the Battle of Grunwald (Polish: Przed bitwą grunwaldzką), Jagiełło at the bedside of the dead Jadwiga (Polish: Jagiełło u łoża umarłej Jadwigi), Episode from the January Uprising (Polish: Epizod z powstania styczniowego) or the Death of Wanda, relating the legend of a Polish princess who chose suicide rather than marrying a German husband. Worth noticing, whenever he wrote about his native city in his German letters, Maximilian always used Bydgoszcz instead of Bromberg.

Emotional binds between Piotrowski and Bydgoszcz are to be found in many of his works, inter alia:

- Boys playing with the ruins of the Bydgoszcz castle in the background (Polish: Chłopcy przy zabawie na tle ruin zamku bydgoskiego);
- Kujawy meetings (Polish: Spotkania kujawskie);
- Raftsmen dancing on a boat (Polish: Taniec flisaków na łodzi);
- Raftsmen's Supper (Polish: Wieczerza flisaków);
- Before going to church (Polish: Przed udaniem się do kościoła), a family portrait;
- portraits of his relatives (father, mother, sister, brother).

As for the pious paintings, some of them are still exposed in Bydgoszcz churches: Saint Giles (Polish: Święty Idzi) in Saint Andrew Bobola's Church and the Madonna of the Immaculate Conception (Polish: Madonna Niepokalanego Poczęcia) in St Peter's and St Paul's Church. The latter was originally placed in the church of St. Ignatius of Loyola, razed in 1940.

== Recognition ==
First modern researches on Piotrowski were initiated during the interwar period by Bydgoszcz archivist Zygmunt Malewski. It was only after World War II that an extensive literature about the painter appeared.

From December 20, 1925, till January 25, 1926, an exhibition of Maximilian's works was set up in Bydgoszcz and in Toruń a year later, at the occasion of the 50th anniversary of his death. The artist, almost completely forgotten at that time, was portrayed through 92 works in the halls of the Municipal Museum. Until the ouset of the war, the museum carried out a campaign to collect Piotrowski's items: by 1939, over 100 oil paints, watercolors, tempera paintings and drawings were gathered from donations and purchases, such as:

- Counselor Adam Logi from Poznań donated in 1927, a Portrait of Wilhelm Schadow, Balcony scene, Portrait of the artist's siblings and Portrait of the artist's mother (from 1848);
- Father prelate Tadeusz Malczewski donated the oil painting St. Salome, painted in 1837 for the Bydgoszcz Cathedral;
- The artist's family (grandson Stanisław and niece - Pelagi Thierling from Poznań) donated 39 works, among which Artist's self-portrait with a palette in 1936;
- the museum purchased several oil paintings (Portrait of the artist's sister, Rest and revolutionist - a study) in 1928, and Portrait of a woman in a white dress in 1934.

Unfortunately, many of Piotrowski's works were destroyed during the last days of Bydgoszcz occupation, although the Nazi authorities ordered the entire collection to be evacuated to the countryside. The museum losses are estimated to 113 works (including 33 oil paintings, 3 watercolors, 1 tempa, 3 inks and 73 sketches and drawings), while only 10 paintings have been salvaged.

After the war, the District Museum in Bydgoszcz received 50 works (3 paintings and 47 drawings) by Maximilian Piotrowski from the Poznań Society of Friends of Learning. In a similar fashion, the institution kept on acquiring or purchasing works from the 1960s to the 1990s, like a batch of 84 drawings from a Poznań deposit in 1967. Latest acquisitions date back to 2018: Lady from Sorrento (Polish: Kochankowie z Sorrento).

Exhibition of the artist's works were regularly presented by the District Museum (1948, 1963, 1970–1972, 1995). In 2000, for the 125th anniversary of Piotrowski's demise, the Bydgoszcz Museum exhibited the last exhibition to date. Currently, the Bydgoszcz museum collection comprises 21 paintings and 13 drawings and sketches, not to mention the deposit.

On November 26, 1950, for the 75th anniversary of his death, on the initiative of the Society of the Lovers of the City of Bydgoszcz (Polish: Towarzystwo Miłośników Miasta Bydgoszczy), a commemorative plaque by Piotr Triebler has been placed on the wall of his family house at 22 Długa street. In addition, the association granted funds for the renovation of the painter's tombstone.

One of the streets in downtown Bydzgozcz has been named after the artist, the Maksymilian Piotrowski street.

== Gallery ==
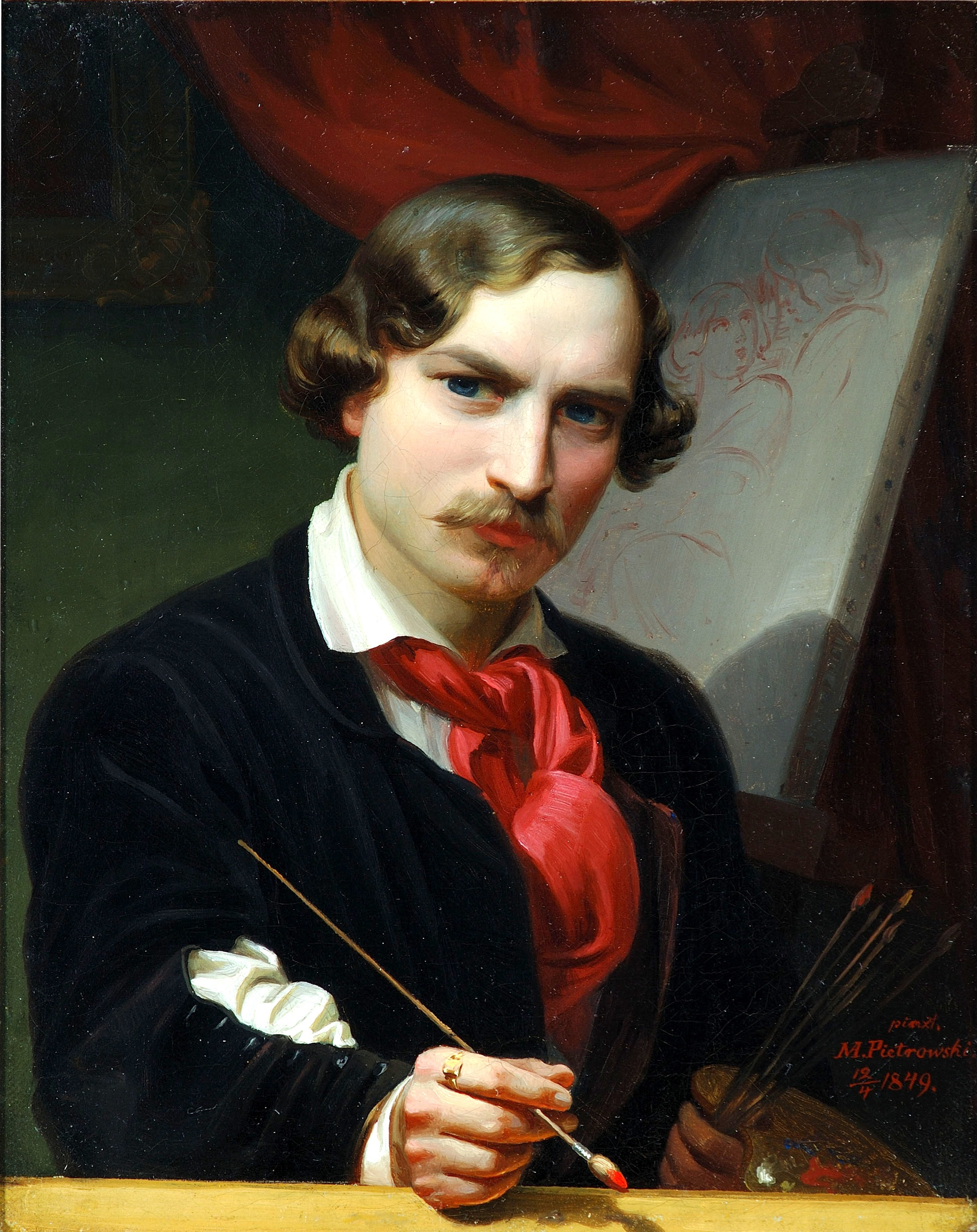
Artist's self-portrait with a palette, Bydgoszcz District Museum

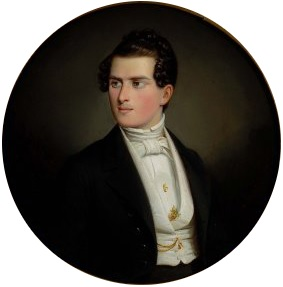
Portrait of the artist brother, Bydgoszcz District Museum

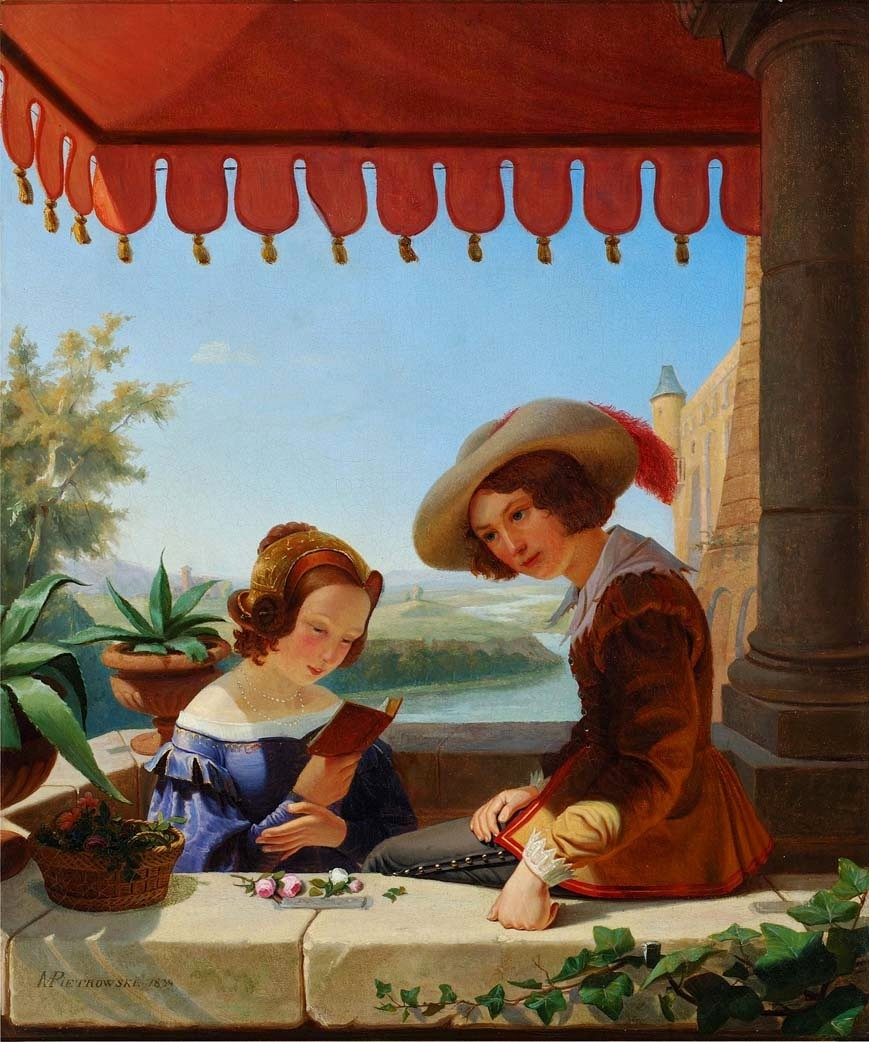
Balcony scene-Siblings portraits, Bydgoszcz District Museum

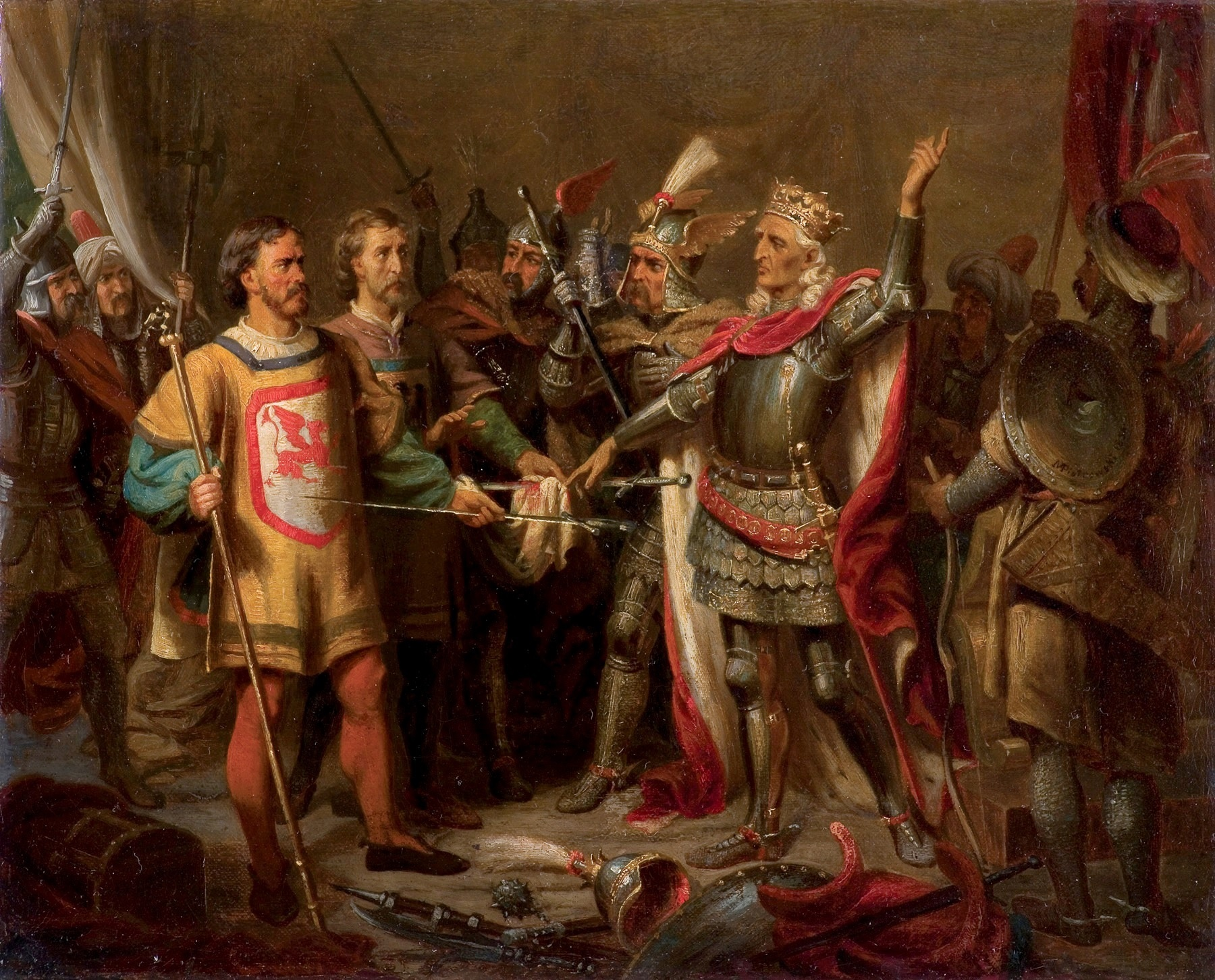
Władysław Jagiełło before the Battle of Grunwald

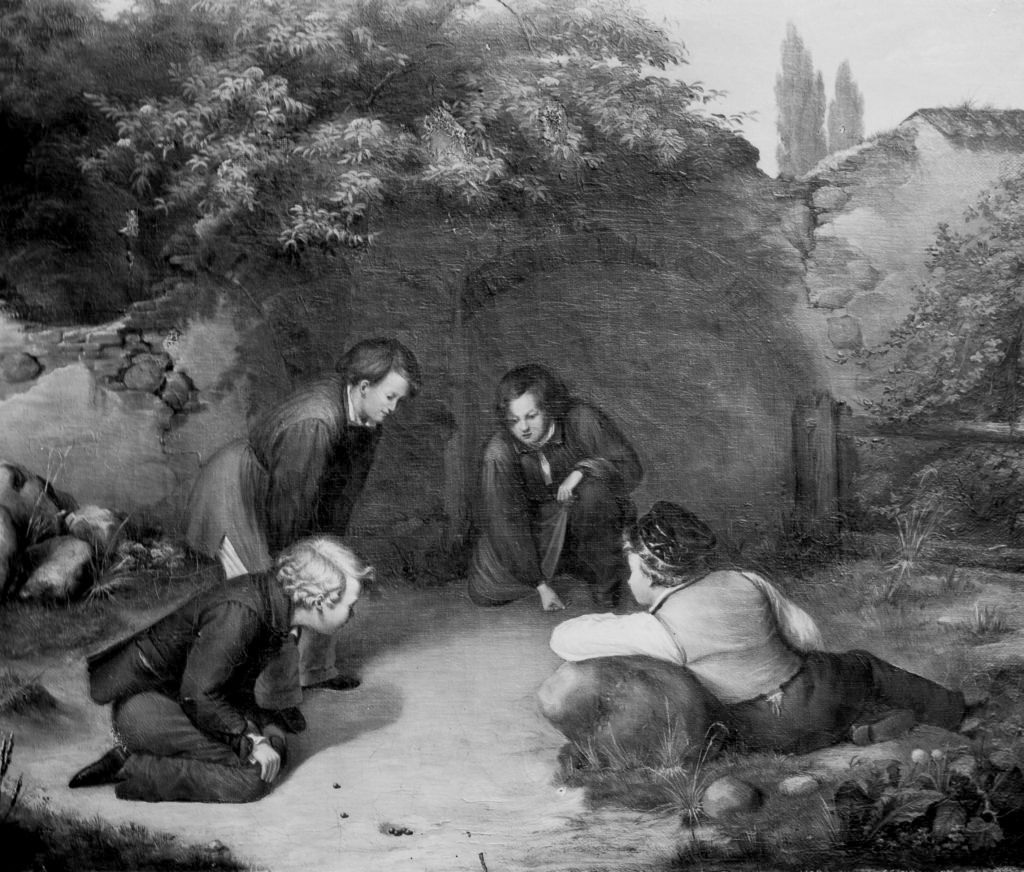
Boys playing with the ruins of the Bydgoszcz castle in the background, Bydgoszcz District Museum

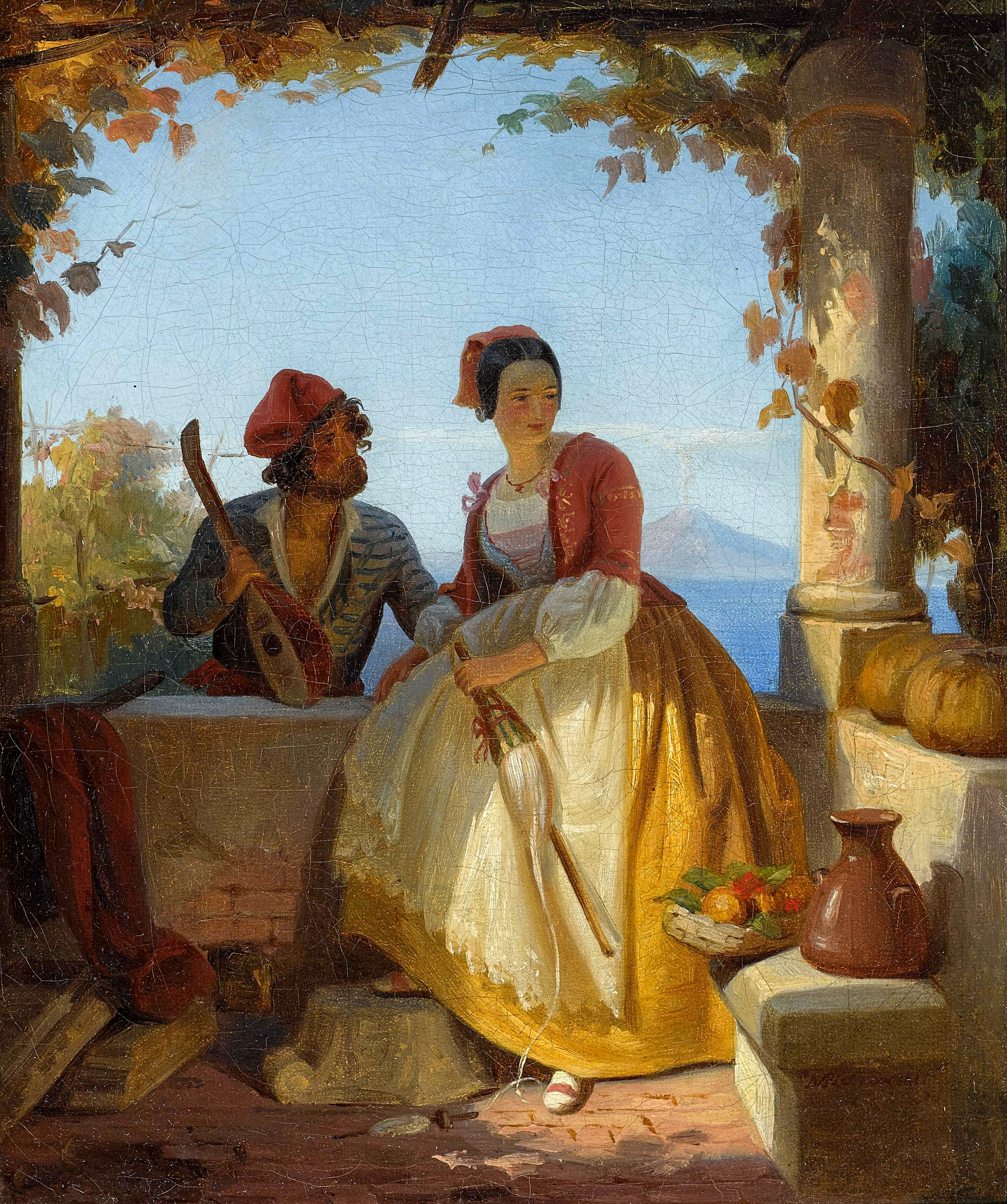
Lady from Sorrento, Bydgoszcz District Museum

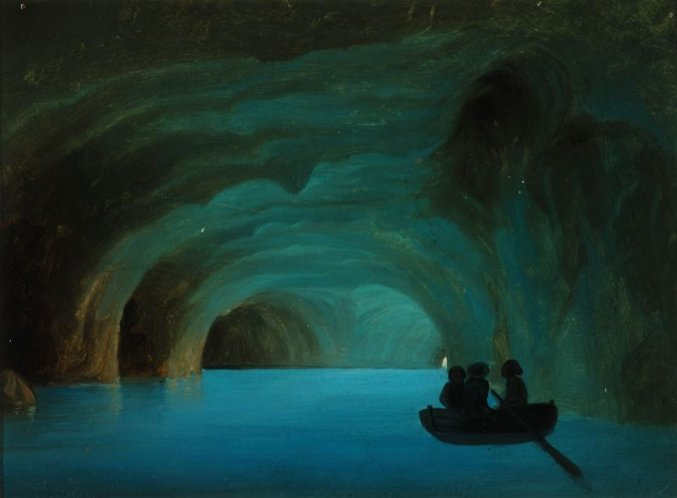
Blue grotto - Capri, Bydgoszcz District Museum

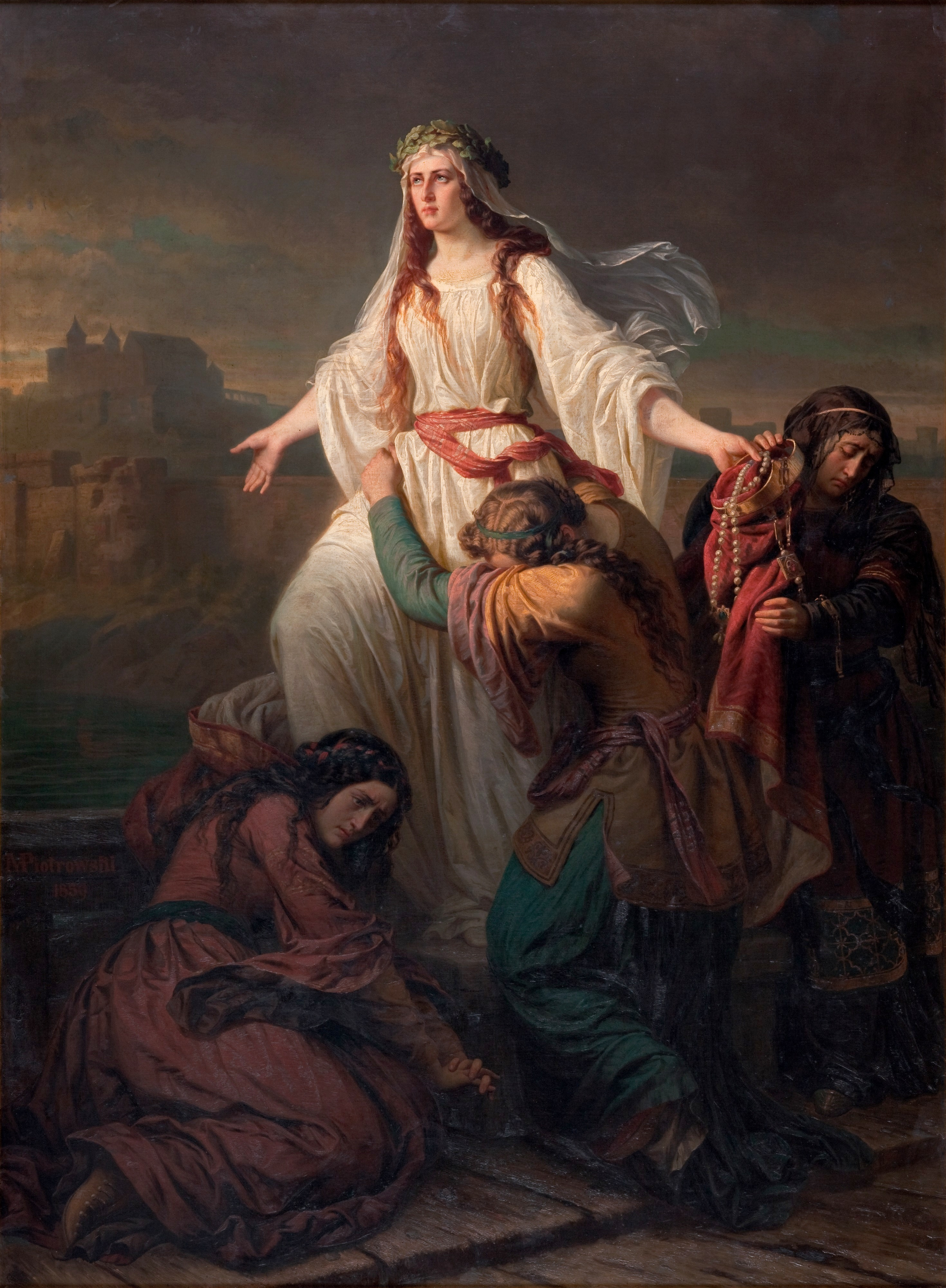
Death of Wanda, National Museum-Kraków

== See also ==
- Bydgoszcz
- Regional Museum in Bydgoszcz
- Kaliningrad
- Düsseldorf school of painting
- Biedermeier period
- Nazarene movement
- List of Polish people

== Bibliography ==
- (in Polish) Puciata-Pawłowska, J. (1957). Maksymilian Antoni Piotrowski (1813-1875). Studia Pomorskie-T2. Bydgoszcz: Studia Pomorskie.
- (in Polish) Sławomir Augusiewicz; Janusz Jasiński, Tadeusz Oracki (2005). Wybitni Polacy w Królewcu : XVI-XX wiek. Olsztyn: Wydawnictwo "Littera". ISBN 8389775034.
- (in Polish) Turwid, Marian (1982). Maksymilian Antoni Piotrowski. Kronika Bydgoska. Bydgoszcz: Towarzystwo Miłosnikow Miasta Bydgoszczy - Bydgoskie Towarzystwo Naukowe. pp. 173–177.
- (in Polish) Chojnacka, Barbara (2019). W poszukiwaniu tożsamości artystycznej - Maksymilian Antoni Piotrowski. Kronika Bydgoska. Bydgoszcz: Towarzystwo Miłosnikow Miasta Bydgoszczy - Bydgoskie Towarzystwo Naukowe. pp. 119–144.
- (in Polish) Perlińska, Anna (2000). MAKSYMILIAN ANTONI PIOTROWSKI. Kalendarz Bydgoski. Bydgoszcz: Towarzystwo Miłośników Miasta Bydgoszczy. pp. 225–230.
