= Piotrowo =

Piotrowo (derived from the name Piotr, "Peter") may refer to the following places in Poland:

- Piotrowo, part of the Nowe Miasto district of Poznań
- Piotrowo, Oborniki County in Greater Poland Voivodeship (west-central Poland)
- Piotrowo, Słupca County in Greater Poland Voivodeship (west-central Poland)
- Piotrowo, Szamotuły County in Greater Poland Voivodeship (west-central Poland)
- Piotrowo, Śrem County in Greater Poland Voivodeship (west-central Poland)
- Piotrowo, Nakło County in Kuyavian-Pomeranian Voivodeship (north-central Poland)
- Piotrowo, Włocławek County in Kuyavian-Pomeranian Voivodeship (north-central Poland)
- Piotrowo, Łódź Voivodeship (central Poland)
- Piotrowo, Masovian Voivodeship (east-central Poland)
- Piotrowo, Kartuzy County in Pomeranian Voivodeship (north Poland)
- Piotrowo, Lębork County in Pomeranian Voivodeship (north Poland)
- Piotrowo, Gmina Nowy Dwór Gdański in Pomeranian Voivodeship (north Poland)
- Piotrowo, Warmian-Masurian Voivodeship (north Poland)
