= Tom Piotrowski (economist) =

Australian economist

Tom Piotrowski (born 1967) is an Australian economist. He worked for financial services company CommSec as a market analyst for more than two decades before joining National Australia Bank in early 2026.

== Personal life ==
Piotrowski's parents were born overseas, described as "new to Australia" during his youth.

== Media ==
Piotrowski regularly presented stock market updates for CommSec on Australian television. As a result of his presence on television, he became a cult figure in the late 2000s, inspiring fansites on social networking sites Facebook and Myspace. Rove McManus paid tribute to him on his show Rove Live with regular crosses to Tom Piotrowski detailing the week in finance throughout 2009.
