= Kreis Wirsitz =

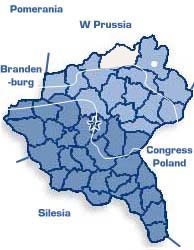

Kreis Wirsitz was one of 14 or 15 Kreise (English: counties) in the northern administrative district of Bromberg, in the Prussian province of Posen. The county existed with essentially the same boundaries beginning in 1815 as a German Kreise then from 1919 as a Polish Powiat until 1975. Its administrative center was the town of Wyrzysk (Wirsitz). The county contained additional municipalities such as Bialosliwie, Lobzenica (Lobsens), Miasteczko Krajeńskie (Friedheim), Mrocza (Mrotschen), Nakło nad Notecią (Nakel), Sadki and Wysoka (Wissek) plus over 100 villages. Many villages that had Germanic names were changed to completely different Polish names following World War II, such as Radzicz (formerly Hermannsdorf). In 1954 the central government abolished the commune (Polish: gmina) as the smallest unit of government, dividing the county into 28 clusters. In 1973 municipalities were restored. After the administrative reform of 1975, the territory of the county was divided between the new (lower) region of Bydgoszcz and the region Piła. The territory of the defunct county was annexed by Naklo County, Kujavian-Pomeranian Voivodeship and Pila County, Greater Poland Voivodeship. Wyrzysk was incorporated into Piła County.

== History ==
The area around the town of Wyrzysk, then part of the Duchy of Warsaw, became part of the Grand Duchy of Posen on May 15, 1815, as accorded at the Congress of Vienna. The rather titulary Grand Duchy of Posen, held by the Hohenzollern, the ruling family in the Kingdom of Prussia, was in fact an autonomous province within Prussia, but not belonging to those territories covered by the loose league called the German Confederation. Its constitutional peculiarity had been abolished on December 5, 1848, when it was converted into the Prussian Province of Posen, by way of which it was transformed into one of Prussia's regional subdivisions, but still no part of the German Confederation.

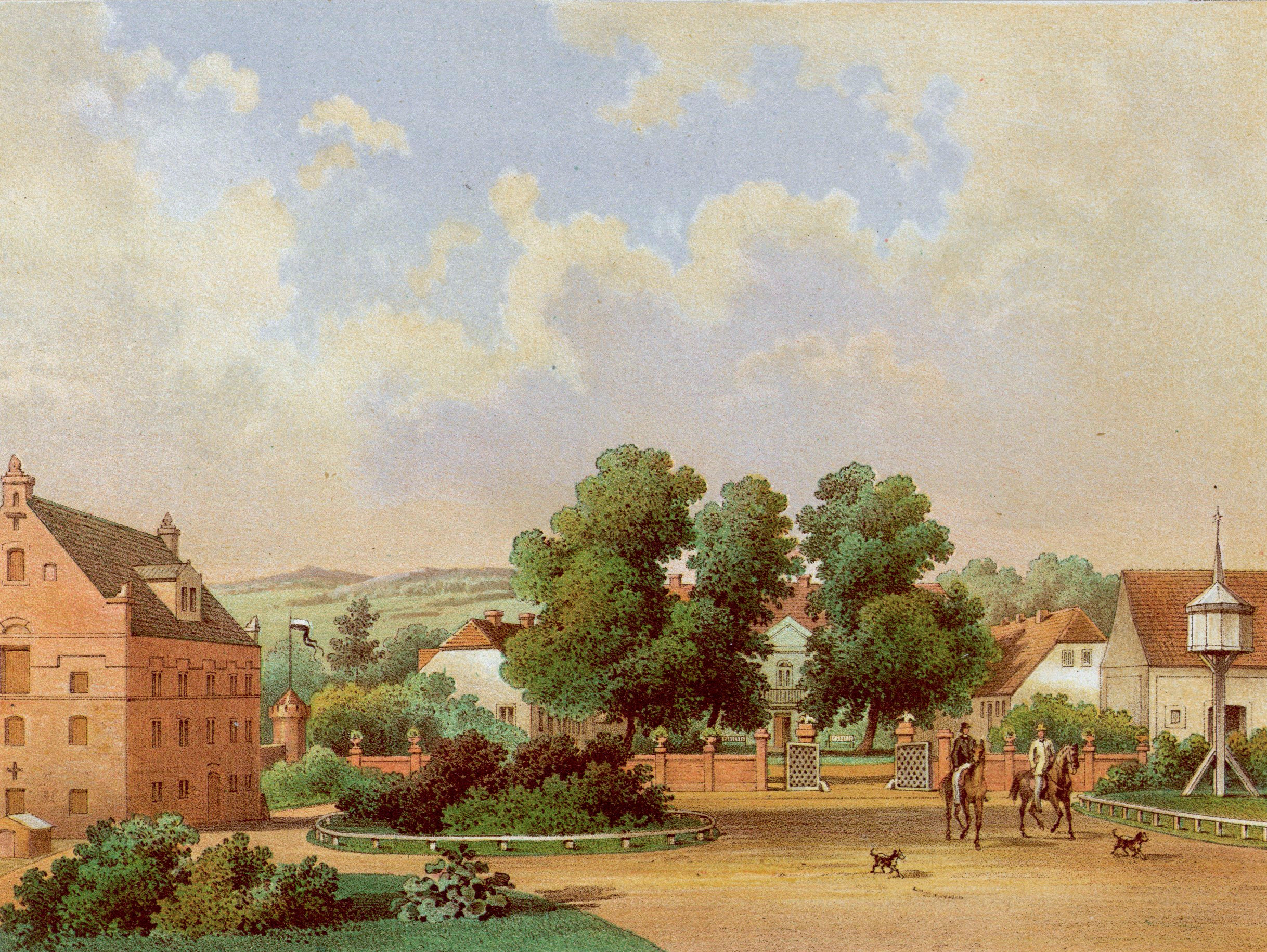
The Rittergut in Brostowo

On July 1, 1816, the county of Wyrzysk (German: Kreis Wirsitz) was formed. After a territorial reorganisation within the Kingdom of Prussia the borders of the Kreis Wirsitz were partly redrawn so that by January 1, 1818, the municipality of Kcynia (German: Exin) became a part of the neighbouring county of Schubin (Polish: Szubin). The town of Wyrzysk (German: Wirsitz) domiciled the county administration.

Being an administrative unit of the Kingdom of Prussia the Kreis Wirsitz joined the newly founded North German Confederation in July 1867, becoming thereby for the first time part of a German commonwealth. By way of unification of German states the North German Confederation had been enlarged by southern German states and constitutionally reinforced to become a united Germany on January 18, 1871, with Kreis Wirsitz being part of it.

The members of the German parliament (German: Reichstag) forming the Polish National Democratic Party (Polish: Stronnictwo Narodowo-Demokratyczne), led by Władysław Taczanowski (1825–1893), protested on April 1, 1871, in the parliament of the newly founded united Germany against Prussia joining with all her provinces united Germany.

On December 27, 1918, the Greater Poland uprising started and involved most of the Prussian Province of Posen, where Poles formed the majority. While the Uprising, terminated by a German-Polish ceasefire agreed on February 16, 1919, led to an end of German rule in most of the territory of the province of Posen, its northern outskirts including the Kreis Wirsitz remained calm and under German control. This may be because it had a German majority population. According to the Prussian census of 1858, Kreis Wirsitz had a population of 54,044, of which 29,339 (54.3%) were Germans and 24,705 (45.7%) were Poles.

== Demographics ==
Ethnolinguistic structure of Kreis Wirsitz
Census year	Population	German		Polish / Bilingual / Other	
1846	46,954	21,882	46.6%	25,072	53.4%
1849	47,014	21,705	46.2%	25,309	53.8%
1858	54,044	29,339	54.3%	24,705	45.7%
1910	67,219	34,235	50.9%	32,984	49.1%

== Powiat Wyrzyski (1919-1939) ==
By the Treaty of Versailles on June 28, 1919 Germany ceded the Kreis Wirsitz to the newly reestablished Poland. On November 25, 1919, both countries agreed upon how to hand over the territories ceded to Poland, but still held by Germany. This agreement was ratified on January 10, 1920. So official representatives of Germany (soldiers, government officials and the like) left the Kreis Wirsitz between January 17 and February 4, 1920, which was then factually taken over by Poland.

The Kreis Wirsitz officially became the powiat Wyrzyski (Polish for county of Wyrzysk). The population of ceded territories was entitled to choose to become Poles or remain Germans. Many ethnic Germans emigrated to Germany (so-called optants, who opted not to become Poles). This emigration and intra-Polish migration resulted in figures as measured in the Polish census of 1931. Then 20.5% of the county's population were Germans.

On April 1, 1938, the powiat Wyrzyski was ceded from the Poznań Voivodeship (the Polish name of the province of Posen), to the Voivodeship of Pomerania which was renamed the Greater Pomerania (Polish: Województwo Wielkopomorskie). Covering most of the territory of historical Pomerelia, this voivodeship is also called Voivodeship of Pomerelia, to avoid confusion with the Prussian Province of Pomerania, with the Free State of Prussia being a federal state of Germany.

== Landkreis Wirsitz (1939-1945) ==
A few days after the beginning of World War II, being along the border of Prussia and due to the routing of the Ostbahn this strategically important county was occupied by German troops. On 26 October 1939, German administration as a Landkreis began under the old name Wirsitz. Contrary to international treaties, the county and its province were annexed unilaterally by the German Reich. With the invasion of the Soviet Red Army in January 1945, the county was returned to Polish administration under the old name powiat Wyrzyski.

== Powiat Wyrzyski (1945-1975) ==
For more about powiat Wyrzyski, which ceased to exist in 1975 cf. the Polish site Powiat_wyrzyski.

== Military command ==
Kreis Wirsitz was part of the military command in Posen (German: Bezirkskommando) at Bromberg.

== Court system ==
The main court (German: Landgericht) was in Schneidemühl, with lower courts (German: Amtsgericht) in Wirsitz, Lobsens and Nakel.

== Bibliography ==
- "Der Kreis Wirsitz : ein westpreußisches Heimatbuch", by Herbert Papstein, 1982 in German (out of print).

Family History Library call number: 943.84/W2 H2, film #1183530, item 4

- "Altansässige deutsche Bauerngeschlechter in den Kreisen Zempelburg und Wirsitz in Westpreußen", by Hans Jürgen von Wilckens, ("Old established families of the districts of Zempelburg and Wirsitz") 1971 in German (out of print).

Family History Library call number: 943.8 B4, film #1181525, item 10
