= Łodzia =

Łodzia may refer to:

- Łodzia, Kuyavian-Pomeranian Voivodeship, a village in Poland
- Łodzia coat of arms
