= Bnin =

Bnin may refer to the following places in Poland:

- Bnin, Kórnik, a former town, now part of Kórnik near Poznań
- Bnin, Nakło County
- Bnin, Włocławek County
