= Występ =

Występ may refer to the following places:

- Występ, Kuyavian-Pomeranian Voivodeship (north-central Poland)
- Występ, Masovian Voivodeship (east-central Poland)
- Występ, Warmian-Masurian Voivodeship (north Poland)
- Występ, a live album by Kazik Na Żywo
