= Gmina Sadki =

Gmina Sadki Sadki Commune
- Gmina
- Coat of arms
- Interactive map of Gmina Sadki
- Coordinates (Sadki): 53°9′41″N 17°26′46″E
- Country: Poland
- Voivodeship: Kuyavian-Pomeranian
- County: Nakło
- Seat: Sadki

Area
  - Total: 153.69 km^{2} (59.34 sq mi)

Population (2006)
  - Total: 7,149
  - Density: 46.52/km^{2} (120.5/sq mi)
- Website: http://www.sadki.pl

Gmina Sadki is a rural gmina (administrative district) in Nakło County, Kuyavian-Pomeranian Voivodeship, in north-central Poland. Its seat is the village of Sadki, which lies approximately 11 kilometres (7 mi) west of Nakło nad Notecią and 38 km (24 mi) west of Bydgoszcz.

The gmina covers an area of 153.69 square kilometres (59.3 sq mi), and as of 2006 its total population is 7,149.

== Villages ==
Gmina Sadki contains the villages and settlements of Anieliny, Bnin, Broniewo, Dębionek, Dębowo, Glinki, Jadwiżyn, Kraczki, Liszkówko, Łodzia, Machowo, Mrozowo, Radzicz, Sadki, Samostrzel and Śmielin.

== Neighbouring gminas ==
Gmina Sadki is bordered by the gminas of Kcynia, Łobżenica, Mrocza, Nakło nad Notecią and Wyrzysk.

== See also ==
- Gmina Sadki Official Website
