= Dębionek =

- Village
- Location within Poland
- Coordinates: 53°13′N 17°27′E
- Country: Poland
- Voivodeship: Kuyavian-Pomeranian
- County: Nakło
- Gmina: Sadki
- Population: 655
- Time zone: UTC+1 (CET)
  - Summer (DST): UTC+2 (CEST)
- Vehicle registration: CNA

Dębionek [dɛmˈbjɔnɛk] is a village in the administrative district of Gmina Sadki, within Nakło County, Kuyavian-Pomeranian Voivodeship, in north-central Poland.

== History ==
The area formed part of Poland since the establishment of the state in the 10th century. Dębionek was a private village of Polish nobility, administratively located in the Nakło County in the Kalisz Voivodeship in the Greater Poland Province of the Kingdom of Poland. The village was annexed by Prussia in the late-18th-century Partitions of Poland, and was also part of Germany from 1871. Following World War I, Poland regained independence and control of the village.

During the German occupation of Poland (World War II), Poles from Dębionek were among the victims of massacres of Poles from the county, perpetrated by the SS and Selbstschutz in the forest near Sadki in October and November 1939 as part of the Intelligenzaktion.
