= Minikowo =

Minikowo may refer to the following places in Poland:

- Minikowo, part of the Nowe Miasto district of Poznań
- Minikowo, Nakło County
- Minikowo, Tuchola County
