= Gmina Nakło nad Notecią =

Gmina Nakło nad Notecią Nakło nad Notecią Commune
- Gmina
- Coat of arms
- Interactive map of Gmina Nakło nad Notecią
- Coordinates (Nakło nad Notecią): 53°8′25″N 17°35′34″E
- Country: Poland
- Voivodeship: Kuyavian-Pomeranian
- County: Nakło
- Seat: Nakło nad Notecią

Area
  - Total: 186.97 km^{2} (72.19 sq mi)

Population (2019)
  - Total: 31,789
  - Density: 170.02/km^{2} (440.35/sq mi)
  - Urban: 18,281
  - Rural: 13,508
- Website: http://www.naklo.pl

Gmina Nakło nad Notecią is an urban-rural gmina (administrative district) in Nakło County, Kuyavian-Pomeranian Voivodeship, in north-central Poland. Its seat is the town of Nakło nad Notecią, which lies approximately 28 kilometres (17 mi) west of Bydgoszcz.

The gmina covers an area of 186.97 square kilometres (72.2 sq mi), and as of 2019 its total population is 31,789 (out of which the population of Nakło nad Notecią amounts to 18,281, and the population of the rural part of the gmina is 13,508). The gmina constitutes 16.69% of the district's area.

== Villages ==
Apart from the town of Nakło nad Notecią, Gmina Nakło nad Notecią contains the villages and settlements of Anielin, Bielawy, Bogacin, Chrząstowo, Elżbiecin, Gabrielin, Gorzeń, Gostusza, Gumnowice, Janowo, Karnówko, Karnowo, Kazin, Kaźmierowo, Lubaszcz, Małocin, Michalin, Minikowo, Niedola, Nowakówko, Olszewka, Paterek, Piętacz, Polichno, Potulice, Rozwarzyn, Ślesin, Suchary, Trzeciewnica, Urszulin, Wieszki and Występ.

== Neighbouring gminas ==
Gmina Nakło nad Notecią is bordered by the gminas of Białe Błota, Kcynia, Mrocza, Sadki, Sicienko and Szubin.
