= Trzeciewnica =

- Village
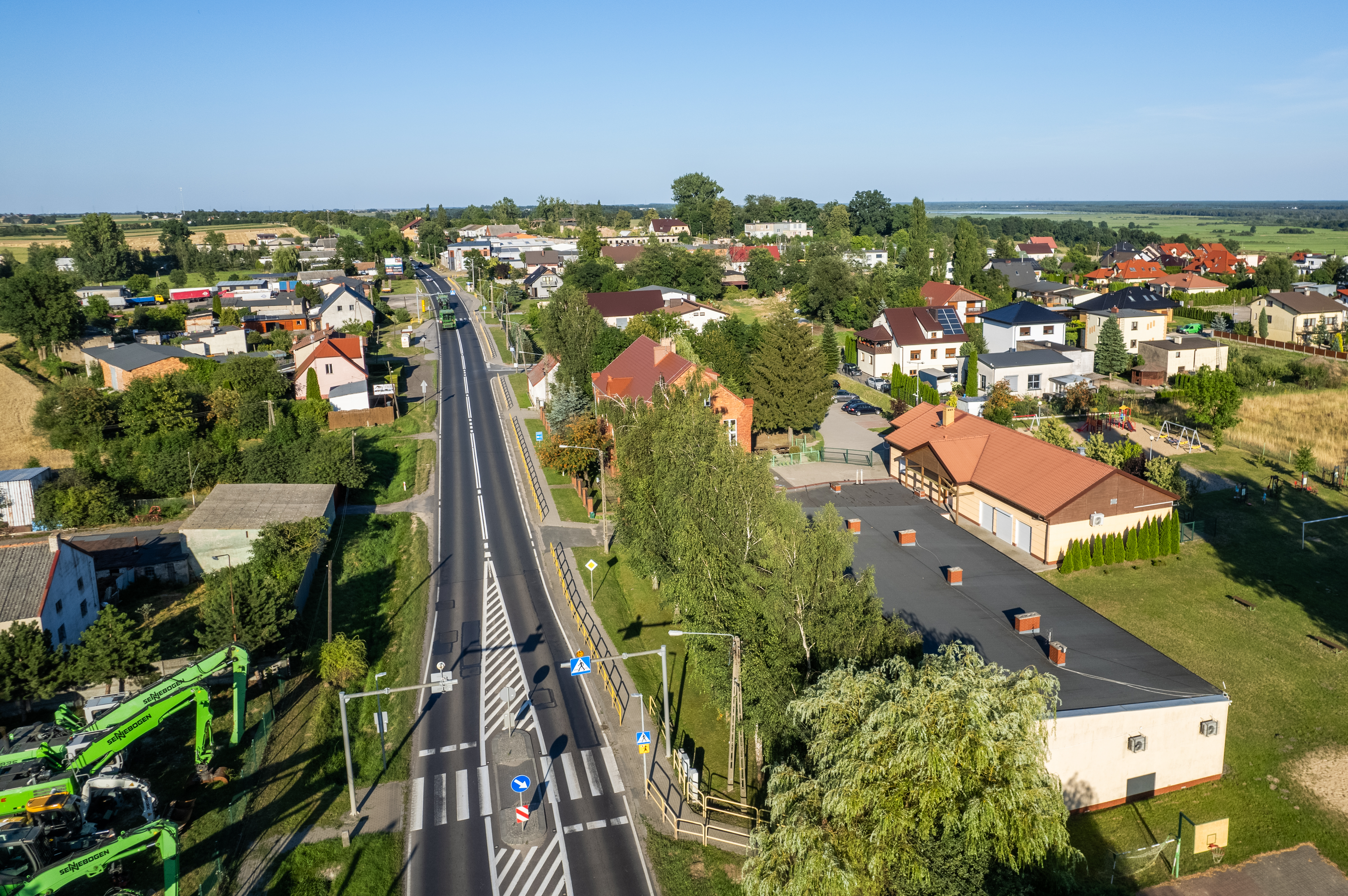
- Trzeciewnica in 2024

- Location within Poland
- Coordinates: 53°10′N 17°39′E
- Country: Poland
- Voivodeship: Kuyavian-Pomeranian
- County: Nakło
- Gmina: Nakło nad Notecią

Population
  - Total: 710

Trzeciewnica [tʂɛt͡ɕɛvˈnit͡sa] is a village in the administrative district of Gmina Nakło nad Notecią, within Nakło County, Kuyavian-Pomeranian Voivodeship, in north-central Poland.

The climate is hemiboreal. The average temperature is 7 °C. The warmest month is July, at 19 °C, and the coldest is January, at −8 °C.
