= Nakło nad Notecią =

Town in Kuyavian-Pomeranian Voivodeship, Poland

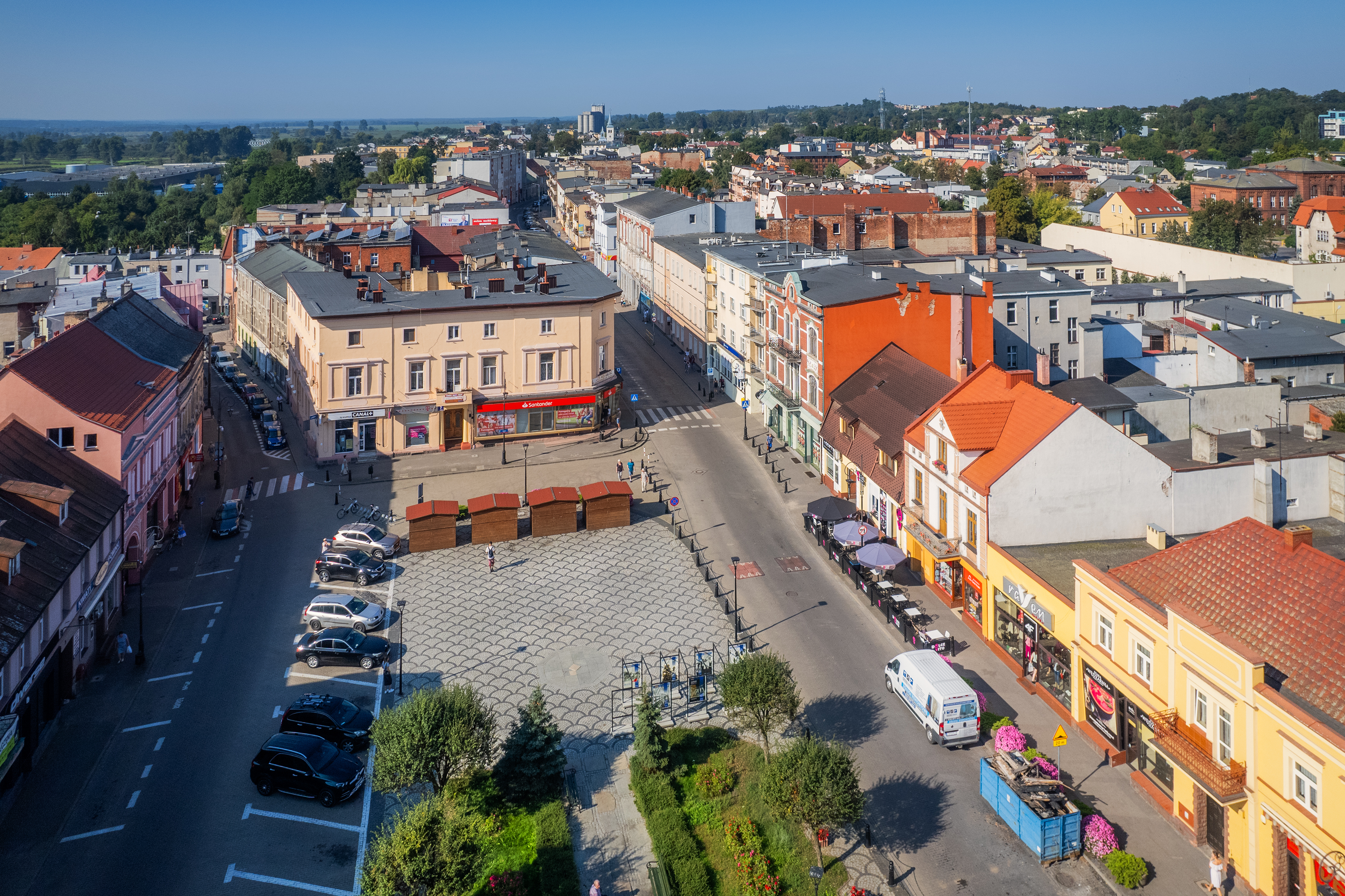
- Market square

- Flag Coat of arms

- Location within Poland
- Coordinates: 53°8′25″N 17°35′34″E
- Country: Poland
- Voivodeship: Kuyavian-Pomeranian
- County: Nakło
- Gmina: Nakło nad Notecią
- First mentioned: 11th century
- Town rights: 1299

Government
  - Mayor: Sławomir Napierała

Area
  - Total: 10.62 km^{2} (4.10 sq mi)

Population (2006)
  - Total: 19,409
  - Density: 1,828/km^{2} (4,733/sq mi)
- Time zone: UTC+1 (CET)
  - Summer (DST): UTC+2 (CEST)
- Postal code: 89-100
- Car plates: CNA
- Website: http://www.naklo.pl

Nakło nad Notecią (Polish pronunciation: [ˈnakwɔ ˌnad nɔˈtɛt͡ɕɔ̃]) (German: Nakel an der Netze) is a town in north-central Poland on the river Noteć with 23,687 inhabitants (2007). It is the seat of Nakło County, and also of Gmina Nakło nad Notecią, situated in the Kuyavian-Pomeranian Voivodeship. It is located in the ethnocultural region of Krajna.

== History ==
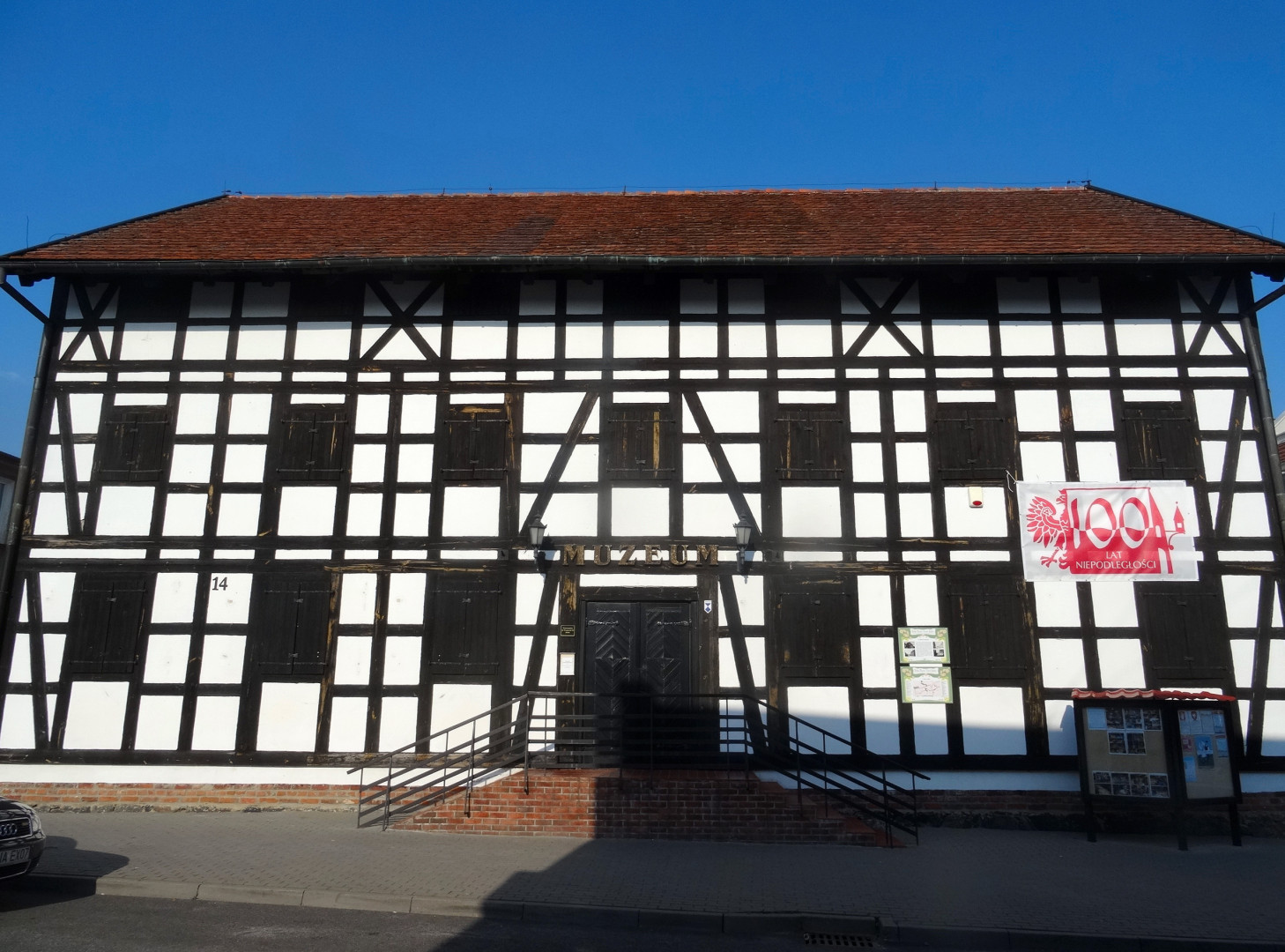
Historical and ethnographic museum located in an old granary

Nakło began to develop as a Pomeranian settlement by the middle of the 10th century. It was initially called Nakieł, and its name comes from the Old Polish word nakieł. The name morphed into Nakło in the 16th century. The town was first mentioned in 11th-century documents. Between 1109 and 1113 it fell to Duke Bolesław III Wrymouth of Poland. It received Magdeburg town rights in 1299. It was a royal town of the Polish Crown and a county seat located in the Kalisz Voivodeship in the Greater Poland Province.

Nakło was annexed by the Kingdom of Prussia during the First Partition of Poland in 1772 and known by the German name Nakel. It began to develop significantly after the completion of the Bydgoszcz Canal, which connected the Vistula with the Noteć, Warta, and Oder rivers. After the defeat of Prussia in the Napoleonic War of the Fourth Coalition, Nakło became part of the Duchy of Warsaw in 1807. After the defeat of Napoleon Bonaparte in 1815, it was restored to Prussia in the Congress of Vienna as part of the autonomous Grand Duchy of Posen. One of the main escape routes for surviving insurgents of the Polish November Uprising from partitioned Poland to the Great Emigration led through the town.

During the course of 19th-century industrialization, Nakło developed further after being connected with the Prussian Eastern Railway in 1851. It became part of the Prussian-led German Empire in 1871, and was the largest city, though not the capital, of Kreis Wirsitz. According to the 1910 census, the population of the town was 8,787, of whom 5,014 (57%) reported German as their sole mother tongue, while 3,662 (42%) reported Polish; the Jewish population was 306 (3.5%).

After World War I, in 1918, Poland regained independence and many inhabitants joined the Greater Poland uprising (1918–19) with the aim to reintegrate the town with the reborn state. The town was captured by Polish insurgents on 1 January 1919, however, they were forced to withdraw in accordance with a Polish-German truce. The Germans then brought reinforcements to the town. In June 1919, American and British journalists visited the town, and the Germans tried to keep Poles away from the journalists. Local Polish craftsman Antoni Nadskakuła shouted a pro-Polish and pro-Allied slogan to the journalists, and was later lynched by the Germans in revenge, and his workshop was destroyed. The town was eventually assigned to the Second Polish Republic according to the Treaty of Versailles. Within interwar Poland, it was administratively located in the Pomeranian Voivodeship.

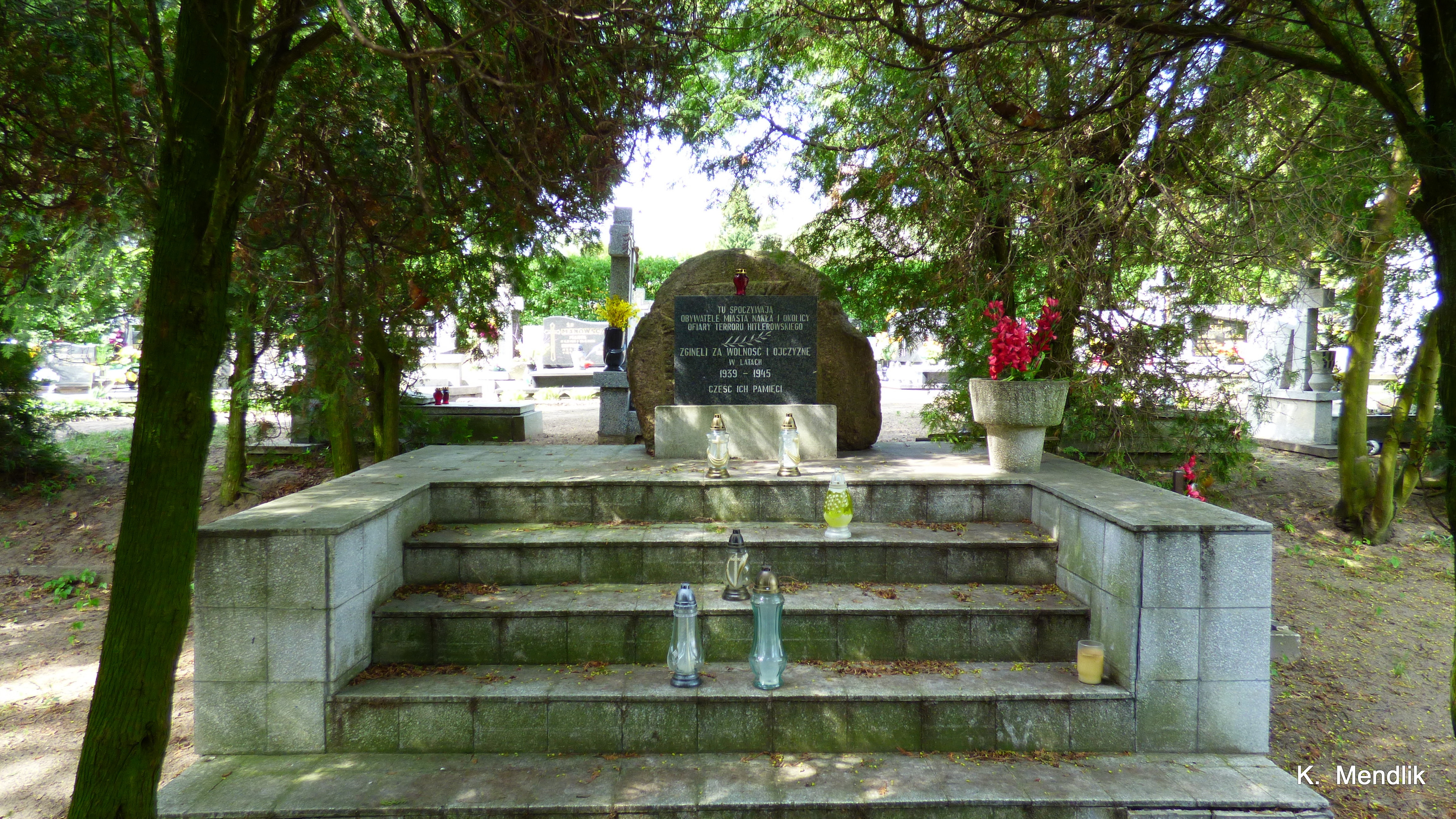
Mass grave of Polish inhabitants murdered by the Germans during World War II

During the invasion of Poland, which started World War II, the German army invaded the town on 3 September 1939, and afterwards it was occupied by Nazi Germany until January 1945. The German gendarmerie and the Selbstschutz carried out mass arrests of Poles in October and November 1939, and a prison for Poles was established in the local gymnasium. Many Poles from Nakło, including teachers, craftsmen, merchants and children, were murdered in large massacres in the nearby village of Paterek. In November 1939, the commander of the SD-EK 16 declared that all Polish intelligentsia capable of resistance had been eliminated. Many Polish families expelled by the Germans from the region were deported to Nakło and then marched from the town to the nearby Potulice concentration camp. 73 Poles from the Nakło County, including 20 policemen, were also murdered by the Russians in the large Katyn massacre in April–May 1940. In August 1944, the Germans brought around 300 Polish forced labourers aged 15–50 from the Wyrzysk area to the town, and then deported them to a newly established forced labour camp in Jajkowo.

The town was administratively part of the Bydgoszcz Voivodeship from 1975 to 1998.

== Sports ==
The local football club is Czarni Nakło. It competes in the lower leagues.

== Notable residents ==
- Elizabeth Granowska (c. 1372–1420), Queen consort of Poland, wife of King Władysław II Jagiełło
- William Raphael (1833–1914), artist
- Nathan Porges (1848–1924), rabbi
- Hermann von Strantz (1853–1936), German general
- Ignaz Jastrow (1856-1937), economist and historian
- Szczęsny Dettloff (1878–1961), historian of art
- Abraham Buschke (1868-1943), doctor
- Klemens Biniakowski (1902–1985), sprinter
- Rafał Blechacz (born 1985), classical pianist, winner of International Chopin Piano Competition

== Twin towns ==
Nakło nad Notecią is twinned with:

- Seymour (United States)
- Elsterwerda (Germany)
- Naklo (Slovenia)

== Gallery ==
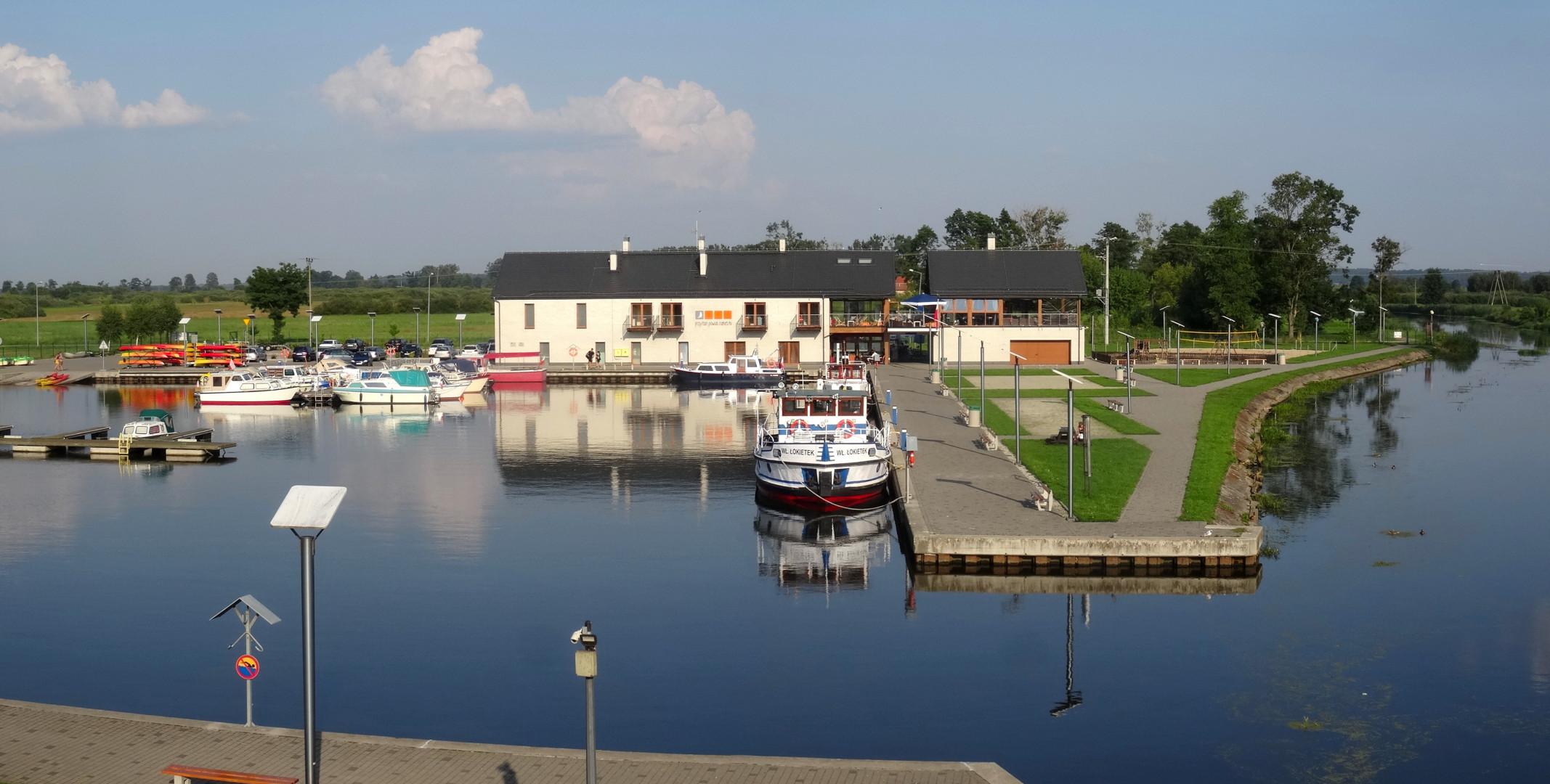
Nakło haven

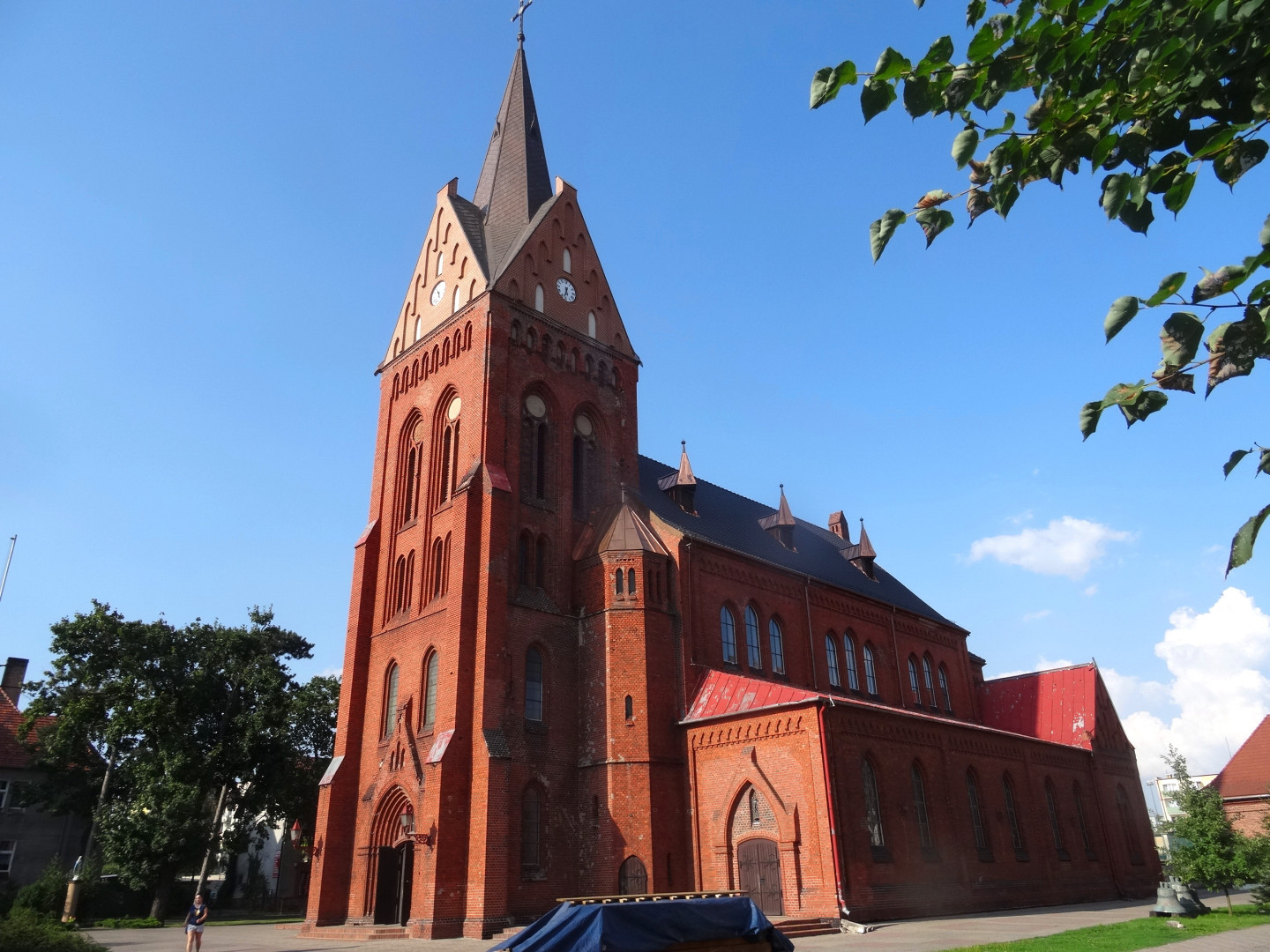
Saint Stanislaus church

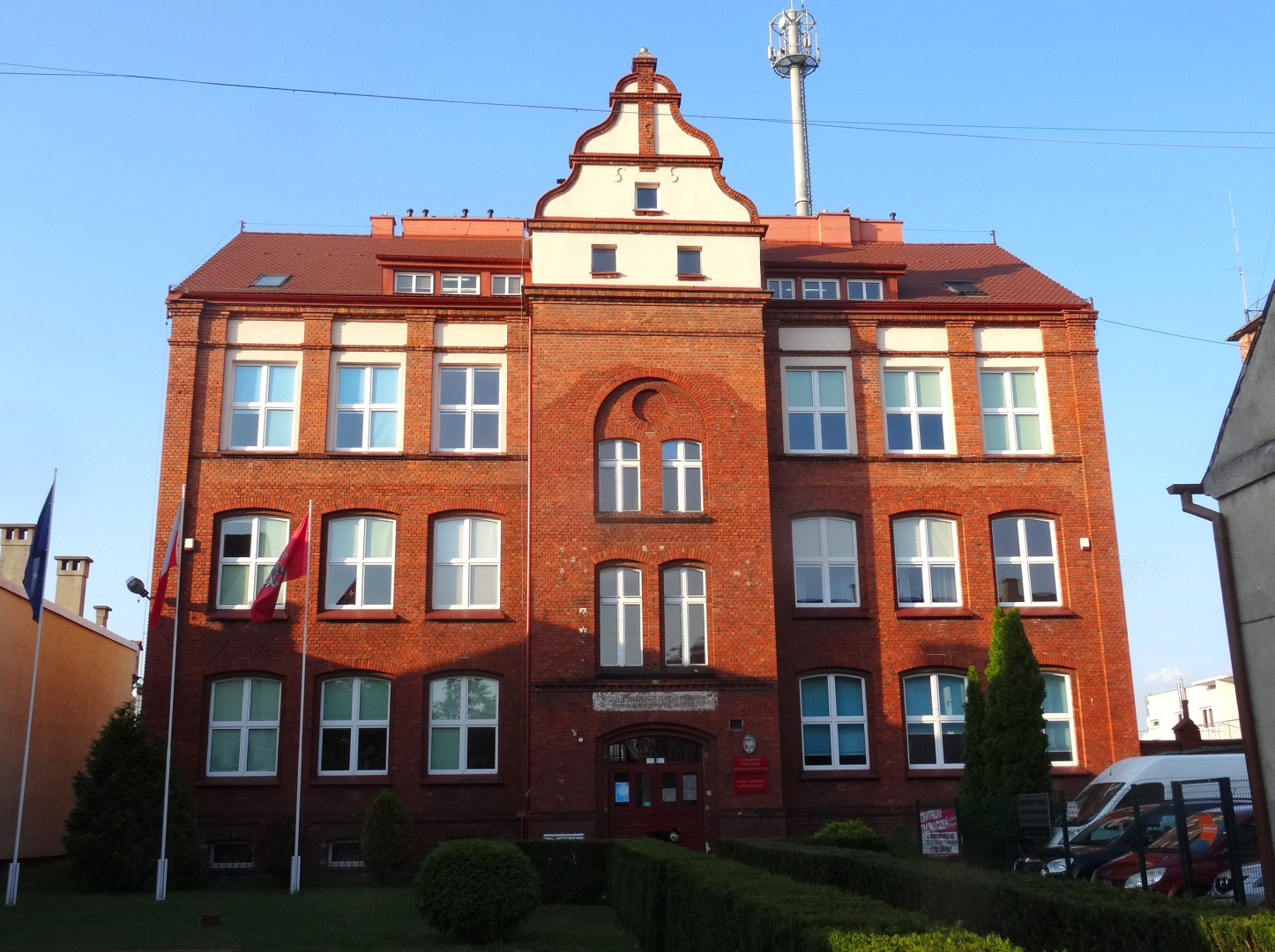
County office

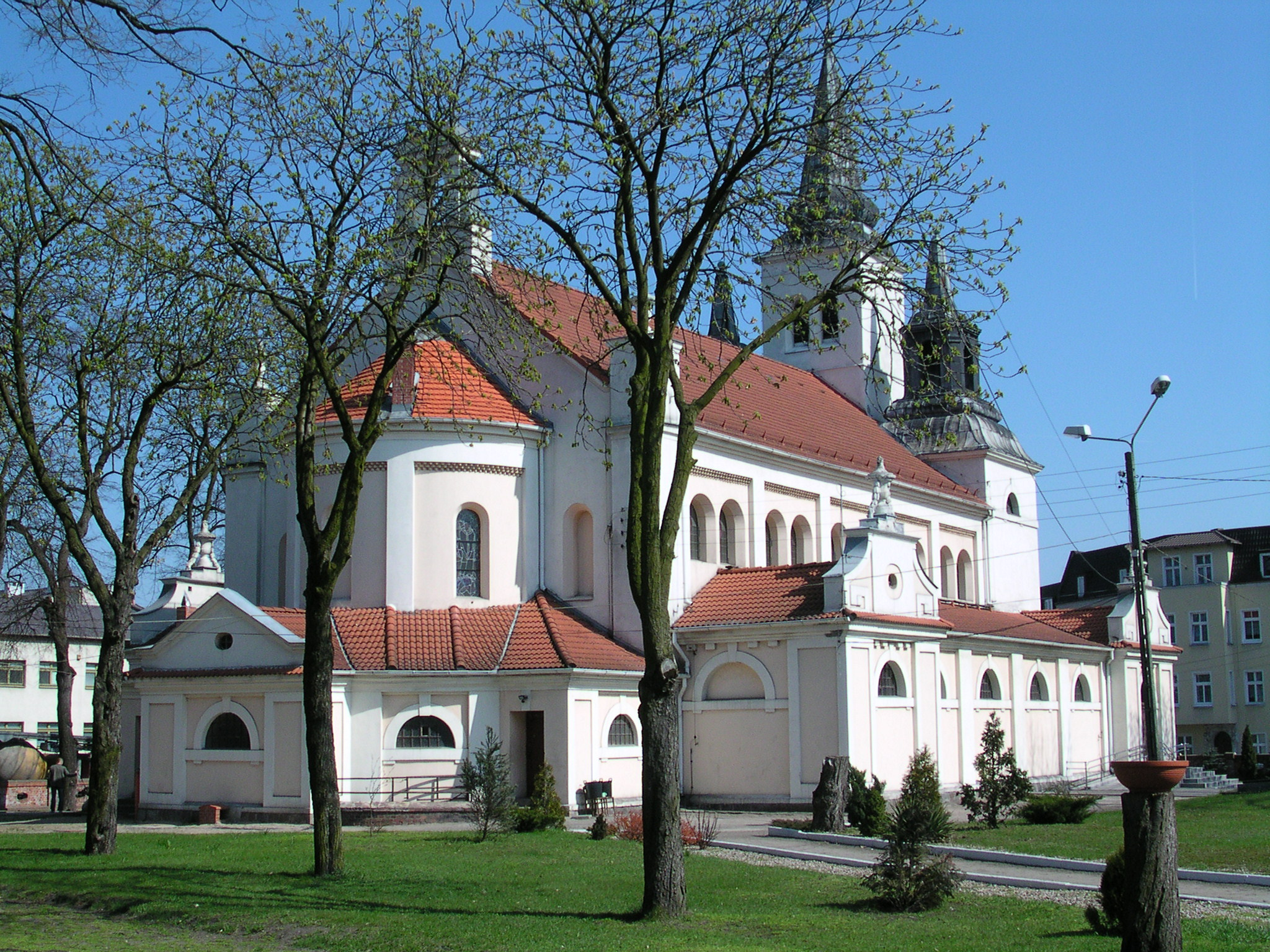
Saint Lawrence church

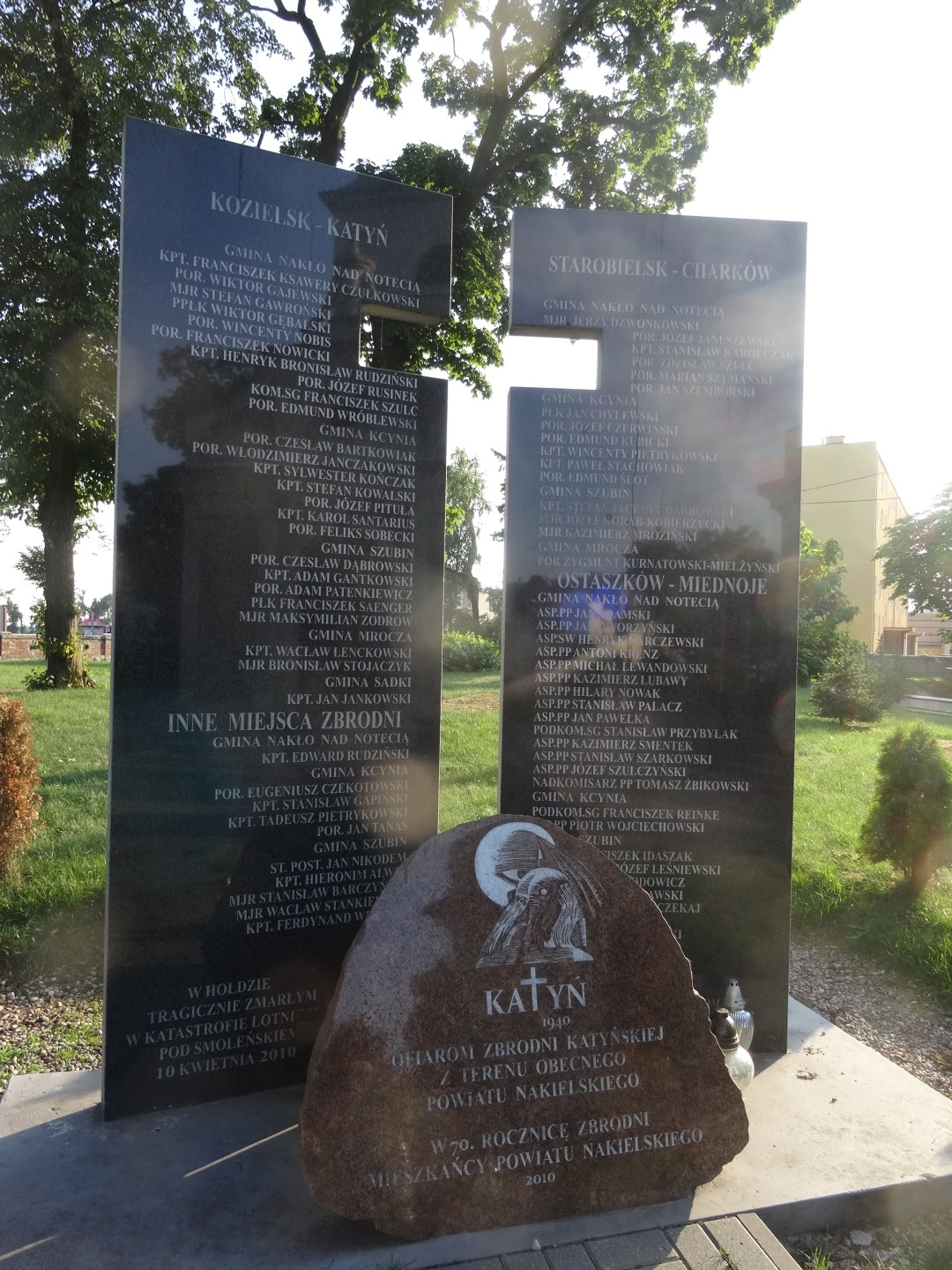
Katyn massacre memorial

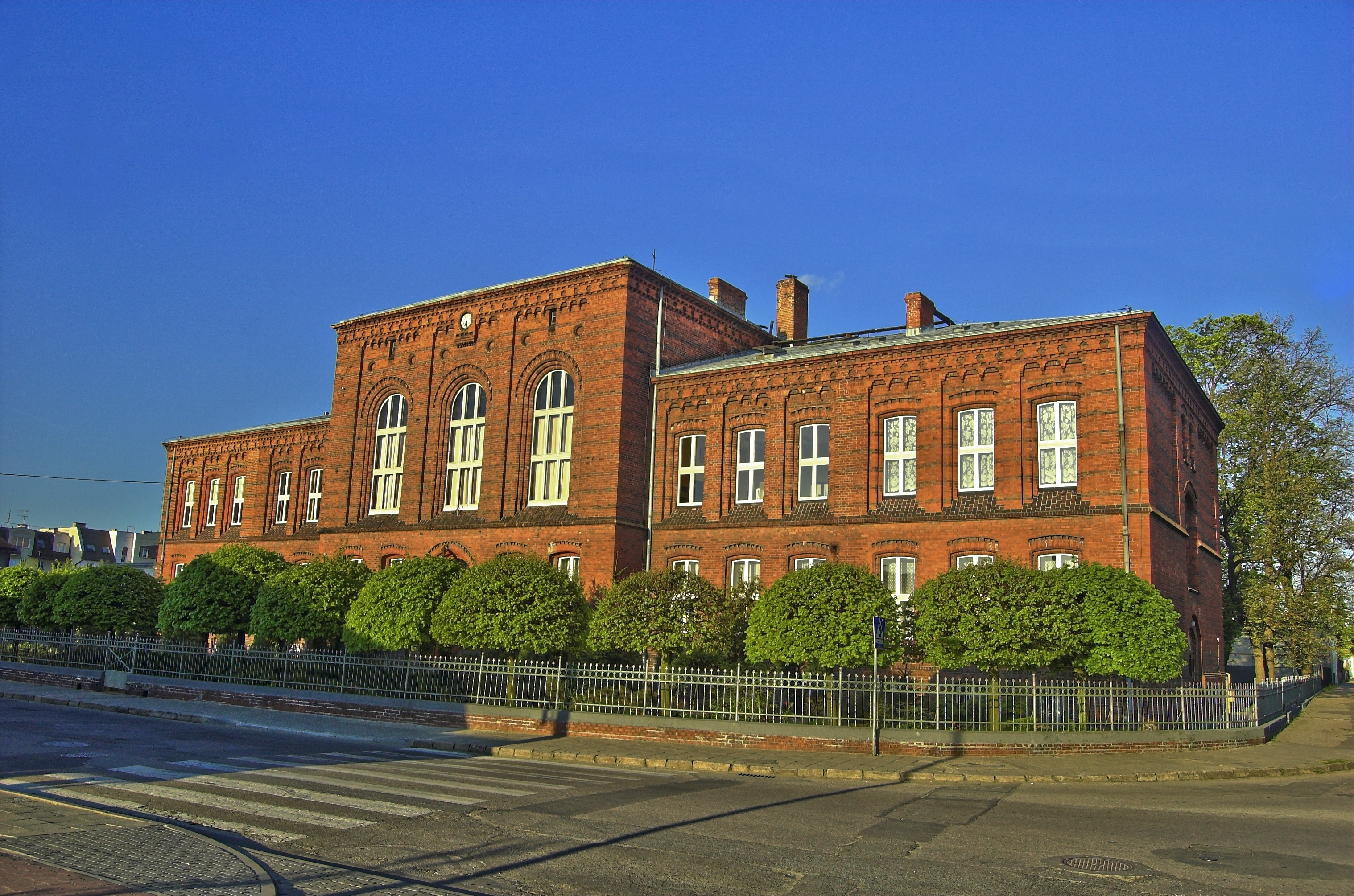
General education liceum (high school)
