= Kazin =

- Village
- Location within Poland
- Coordinates: 53°10′39″N 17°43′19″E
- Country: Poland
- Voivodeship: Kuyavian-Pomeranian
- County: Nakło
- Gmina: Nakło nad Notecią
- Population: 230

Kazin [ˈkaʑin] is a village in the administrative district of Gmina Nakło nad Notecią, within Nakło County, Kuyavian-Pomeranian Voivodeship, in north-central Poland.
