= Anielin, Nakło County =

Anielin
- Village
- Location within Poland
- Coordinates: 53°10′53″N 17°45′0″E
- Country: Poland
- Voivodeship: Kuyavian-Pomeranian
- County: Nakło
- Gmina: Nakło nad Notecią

Anielin [aˈɲɛlin] is a village in the administrative district of Gmina Nakło nad Notecią, within Nakło County, Kuyavian-Pomeranian Voivodeship, in north-central Poland.
