= Radzicz, Kuyavian-Pomeranian Voivodeship =

Radzicz
- Village
- Location within Poland
- Coordinates: 53°11′39″N 17°23′18″E
- Country: Poland
- Voivodeship: Kuyavian-Pomeranian
- County: Nakło
- Gmina: Sadki
- Time zone: UTC+1 (CET)
  - Summer (DST): UTC+2 (CEST)
- Vehicle registration: CNA

Radzicz [ˈrad͡ʑit͡ʂ] is a village in rural Gmina Sadki, within Nakło County, Kuyavian-Pomeranian Voivodeship, in north-central Poland.

== History ==
The area formed part of Poland since the establishment of the state in the 10th century. Radzicz was a private village of Polish nobility, administratively located in the Nakło County in the Kalisz Voivodeship in the Greater Poland Province of the Kingdom of Poland. The village was annexed by Prussia in the late-18th-century Partitions of Poland, and was also part of Germany from 1871. Following World War I, Poland regained independence and control of the village.

During the German occupation of Poland (World War II), Radzicz was one of the sites of executions of Poles, carried out by the Germans in 1939 as part of the Intelligenzaktion. Poles from Radzicz were also among the victims of massacres of Poles perpetrated by the SS and Selbstschutz in the forest near Sadki in October and November 1939, also as part of the Intelligenzaktion.

From 1975 to 1998, Radzicz administratively belonged to Bydgoszcz Voivodeship, superseded by the Kuyavian-Pomeranian Voivodeship.
