= Liszkówko =

- Village
- Location within Poland
- Coordinates: 53°12′50″N 17°21′18″E
- Country: Poland
- Voivodeship: Kuyavian-Pomeranian
- County: Nakło
- Gmina: Sadki

Liszkówko [liʂˈkufkɔ] is a village in the administrative district of Gmina Sadki, within Nakło County, Kuyavian-Pomeranian Voivodeship, in north-central Poland.
