= Samostrzel, Kuyavian-Pomeranian Voivodeship =

Samostrzel
- Village
- Location within Poland
- Coordinates: 53°9′N 17°27′E
- Country: Poland
- Voivodeship: Kuyavian-Pomeranian
- County: Nakło
- Gmina: Sadki
- Population: 552

Samostrzel [saˈmɔstʂɛl] is a village in the administrative district of Gmina Sadki, within Nakło County, Kuyavian-Pomeranian Voivodeship, in north-central Poland.
