= Gorzeń, Kuyavian-Pomeranian Voivodeship =

Gorzeń
- Village
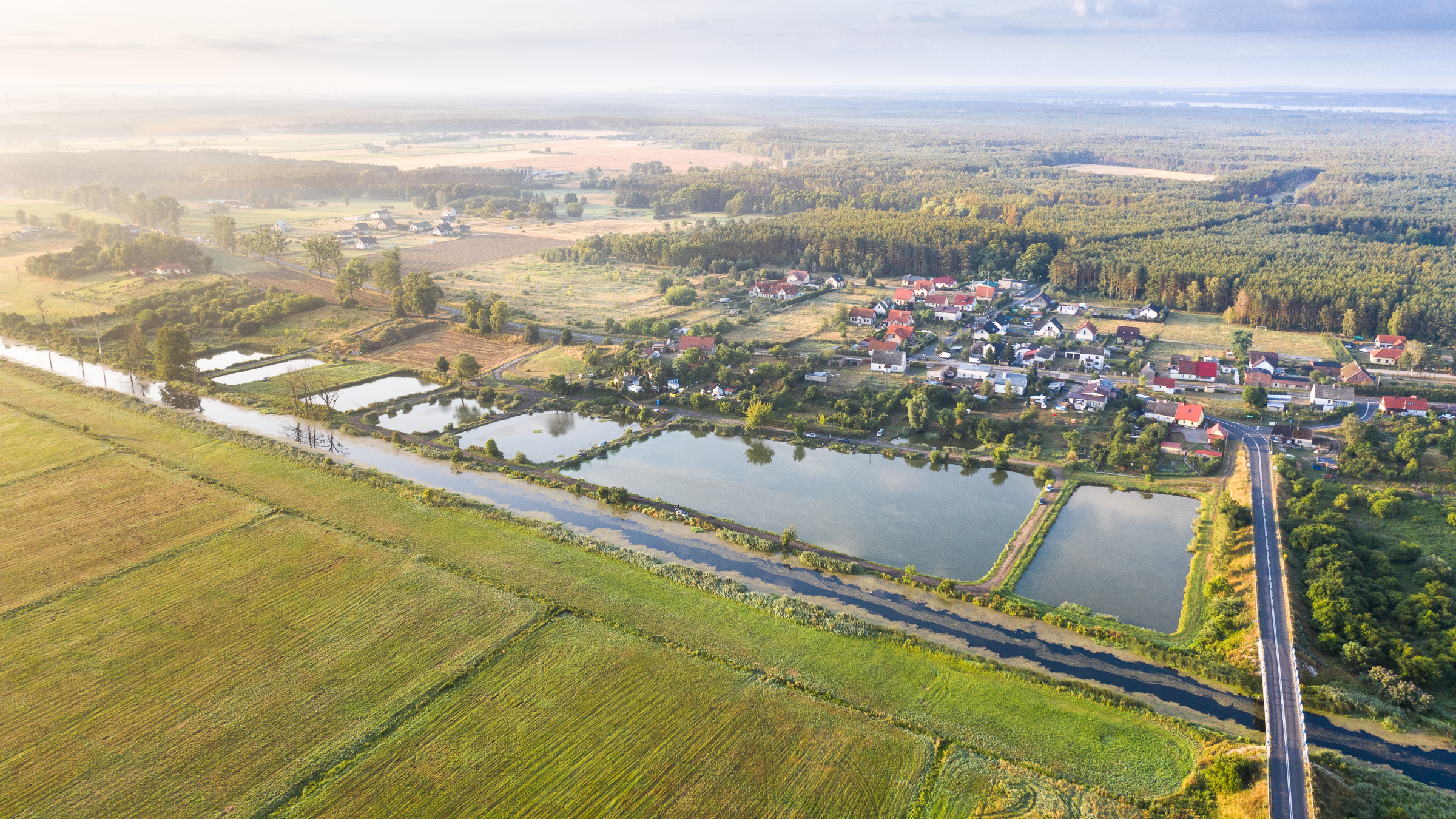
- Aerial view of Gorzeń

- Location within Poland
- Coordinates: 53°8′N 17°44′E
- Country: Poland
- Voivodeship: Kuyavian-Pomeranian
- County: Nakło
- Gmina: Nakło nad Notecią

Gorzeń [ˈɡɔʐɛɲ] is a village in the administrative district of Gmina Nakło nad Notecią, within Nakło County, Kuyavian-Pomeranian Voivodeship, in north-central Poland.
