= Śmielin =

- Village
- Location within Poland
- Coordinates: 53°09′04″N 17°29′11″E
- Country: Poland
- Voivodeship: Kuyavian-Pomeranian
- County: Nakło
- Gmina: Sadki
- Population (approx.): 1,000

Śmielin [ˈɕmjɛlin] is a village in the administrative district of Gmina Sadki, within Nakło County, Kuyavian-Pomeranian Voivodeship, in north-central Poland.

The village has an approximate population of 1,000.
