= William Raphael =

Canadian painter of portraits

- Born: Israel Rafalsky; August 22, 1833; Nakel, West Prussia
- Died: March 15, 1914 (aged 80); Montreal, Quebec
- Education: Royal Academy of Art of Berlin
- Spouse: Ernestina Danziger (m. 1862)

William Raphael RCA (August 22, 1833 – March 15, 1914), born Israel Rafalsky (Yiddish: ישראל ראַפֿאַלסקי), was a Prussian-born Canadian painter of portraits, still lifes, genre scenes and landscapes, best known for his lively scenes of the Montreal harbour and market life. Raphael played a foundational role in the development of professional art practice in Canada, helping to shape the country's nineteenth-century artistic landscape through his work as a painter, teacher, and institutional founder. He was the first Jewish professional artist to establish himself in Canada, a charter member of Montreal's Society of Canadian Artists in 1868, a member of the Ontario Society of Artists in 1879 and a charter member of the Canadian Academy of Arts in 1880.

== Biography ==
Born in Nakel, West Prussia, of Orthodox Jewish background, Raphael left his family home in 1851, on the eve of his eighteenth birthday, to pursue formal artistic training in Berlin. He had a rigid academic training at the Berlin School of Fine Art with Johann Eduard Wolff and Karl Begas. Alongside formal instruction, Raphael cultivated a lifelong habit of drawing and note-taking in sketchbooks, which supported his observational approach to art. During his training in Berlin, Raphael was exposed to academic models rooted in the study of nature and antiquity, producing anatomical studies and small-scale exercises that reflected the expectations of nineteenth-century European art academies.

After completing his training, Raphael chose to settle permanently in Montreal, where he spent the remainder of his life developing his artistic career. In 1856, he emigrated to New York City and then went to Montreal in 1857, where he remained for the rest of his life. He worked at Notman's studio and with A.B. Taber, another photographic firm, during the early years, painting photograph portraits. Raphael's portrait practice quickly brought him to the attention of photographer William Notman, and their collaboration in the late 1850s produced a series of refined painted photographic portraits, including commissions for prominent figures in Montreal society. In time, he became a noted portrait, genre and landscape artist with a wide range of subjects including flora and fauna, religious scenes, as well as making anatomical drawings for medical lectures and publications, illustrations for prints and books such as Picturesque Canada and working as an art restorer. He also taught at the High School of Montreal, the Art Association of Montreal and other schools and colleges as well as starting his own school.

Like Paul Kane and Cornelius Krieghoff, Raphael was known for his paintings of the habitant and First Nations peoples. In 1866, Raphael painted Immigrants at Montreal, later titled Behind Bonsecours Market, purchased by the National Gallery of Canada in 1957. The artist portrayed himself in the painting: he is the man in the crowd carrying a portfolio and a five-pronged candlestick, perhaps inherited from his family (presumably, he was painting what he brought as an immigrant to the New World). He worked and exhibited with the Society of Canadian Artists in Montreal (1867), of which he was a founder, the Art Association of Montreal, the Ontario Society of Artists (member in 1879), and the Royal Canadian Academy of Arts, of which he was a charter member. He also exhibited his work at the Centennial Exposition in Philadelphia in 1876, the Royal Society of British Artists in 1877–1878 and at the Colonial and Indian Exhibition in London in 1886. In 1996, Galerie Walter Klinkhoff in Montreal organized a retrospective of his work. In the final decades of his life, Raphael gradually withdrew from the public art world, a retreat shaped in part by the rise of anti-Semitism in Europe and North America, which contributed to the marginalization of his work prior to his death in 1914.

Raphael was actively involved in the formation and exhibition programs of several key Canadian art institutions, including the Society of Canadian Artists in Montreal, founded in 1867, or which he was a founding member, as well as the Art Association of Montreal, where he contributed regularly to exhibitions. He later become a member of the Ontario Society of Artists in 1879, enabling him to exhibit annually in Toronto, and was a founding academician of the Canadian Academy of Arts at its official inauguration in 1880 (later the Royal Canadian Academy of Arts).

Raphael's contribution to Canadian art history has been reassessed in recent scholarship, highlighting his role in opening new creative pathways for later generations or artists. His work is in public collections such as the National Gallery of Canada, the McCord Museum, the Montreal Museum of Fine Arts, the Musée national des beaux-arts du Québec, the Vancouver Art Gallery, and the Château Ramezay. Among his memberships were the Pen and Pencil Club of Montreal in 1890 (he was an original member), and a member of the Council of Arts and Manufactures of the province of Quebec in 1904.

== Gallery ==
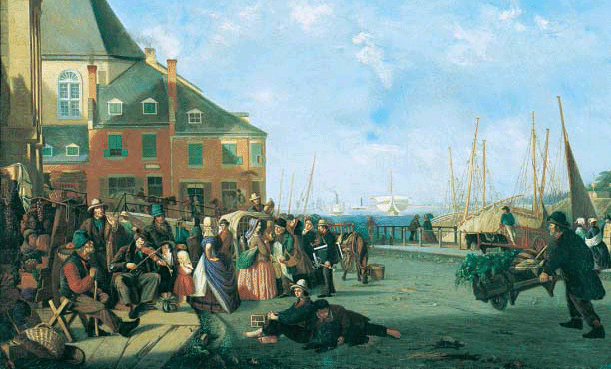
Behind Bonsecours Market, Montreal, 1866, National Gallery of Canada

== Record sale prices ==
In 2015, the National Gallery of Canada purchased Raphael's Bonsecours Market (1880) at auction from Christie's for $324,036.

In 2023, at the Cowley Abbott Auction, Raphael's Bonsecours Market (1864, graphite, ink and watercolour) realized a price of $33,600 and Encampment by the River (1871, oil on canvas) a price of $57,600.
