= Mrozowo =

- Village
- Location within Poland
- Coordinates: 53°9′N 17°23′E
- Country: Poland
- Voivodeship: Kuyavian-Pomeranian
- County: Nakło
- Gmina: Sadki
- Population: 360
- Website: http://www.wyrzysk.net.pl/~mrozowo/

Mrozowo [mrɔˈzɔvɔ] is a village in the administrative district of Gmina Sadki, within Nakło County, Kuyavian-Pomeranian Voivodeship, in north-central Poland.
