= Bielawy, Gmina Nakło nad Notecią =

Bielawy
- Village
- Location within Poland
- Coordinates: 53°8′0″N 17°33′19″E
- Country: Poland
- Voivodeship: Kuyavian-Pomeranian
- County: Nakło
- Gmina: Nakło nad Notecią

Bielawy ([bjɛˈlavɨ]; German: Bielawy, 1942–45 Weißenhof) is a village in the administrative district of Gmina Nakło nad Notecią, within Nakło County, Kuyavian-Pomeranian Voivodeship, in north-central Poland.
