= Henryk Malak =

Polish priest (1912–1987)

Henryk Maria Malak (1912–1987) was a Polish Roman Catholic priest who was incarcerated in Nazi concentration camps during World War II.

== Biography ==
Malak was born November 1, 1912, in the village of Sadki, Kuyavian-Pomeranian Voivodeship, Poland, completed secondary school in May 1932 and was accepted at the Archdiocesan Seminary in Gniezno. He completed his theological studies at the seminary in Poznań and was ordained a priest at the Poznań Cathedral on June 11, 1938. Fr. Malak served for a time in the town of Września then became a vicar of the St. Joseph Parish in Inowrocław. Two months after the Germans invaded Poland on September 1, 1939, Fr. Malak and Catholic priests throughout the region were arrested by the Gestapo.

=== Concentration camps ===
Fr. Malak spent the next six years in Nazi concentration camps. He was initially in Stutthof and Grenzdorf in Poland, then Sachsenhausen and Dachau in Germany. He spent the last four years in Dachau until he was liberated by the U.S. Army in 1945. After liberation, he served as a pastor in Germany, ministering to displaced Polish refugees until emigrating to the United States in 1950.

=== In the United States ===
In the United States, Malak's activities included work as an editor of articles and pamphlets in English and Polish at the Franciscan Publishers in Pulaski, Wisconsin. He also provided spiritual guidance to the regions Polish emigre community through sermons and the organization of religious retreats. In 1960, Fr. Malak began research on Mother Mary Theresa Dudzik, a Polish nun who founded the Franciscan Sisters of Chicago in 1894, an order devoted to the care of the elderly and the poor. He was appointed postulator for her cause in 1963. Fr. Malak`s research on Mother Mary Theresa's life and virtues resulted in two books and a pamphlet. Cardinal John Cody initiated a tribunal in 1979 to study her cause and appointed Malak as consultant.

=== Death ===
Malak died on July 19, 1987, at the infirmary of the Franciscan Sisters in Lemont, Illinois. Malak's obituary was published in the Chicago Tribune on July 21, 1987.
