= Lubaszcz =

- Village
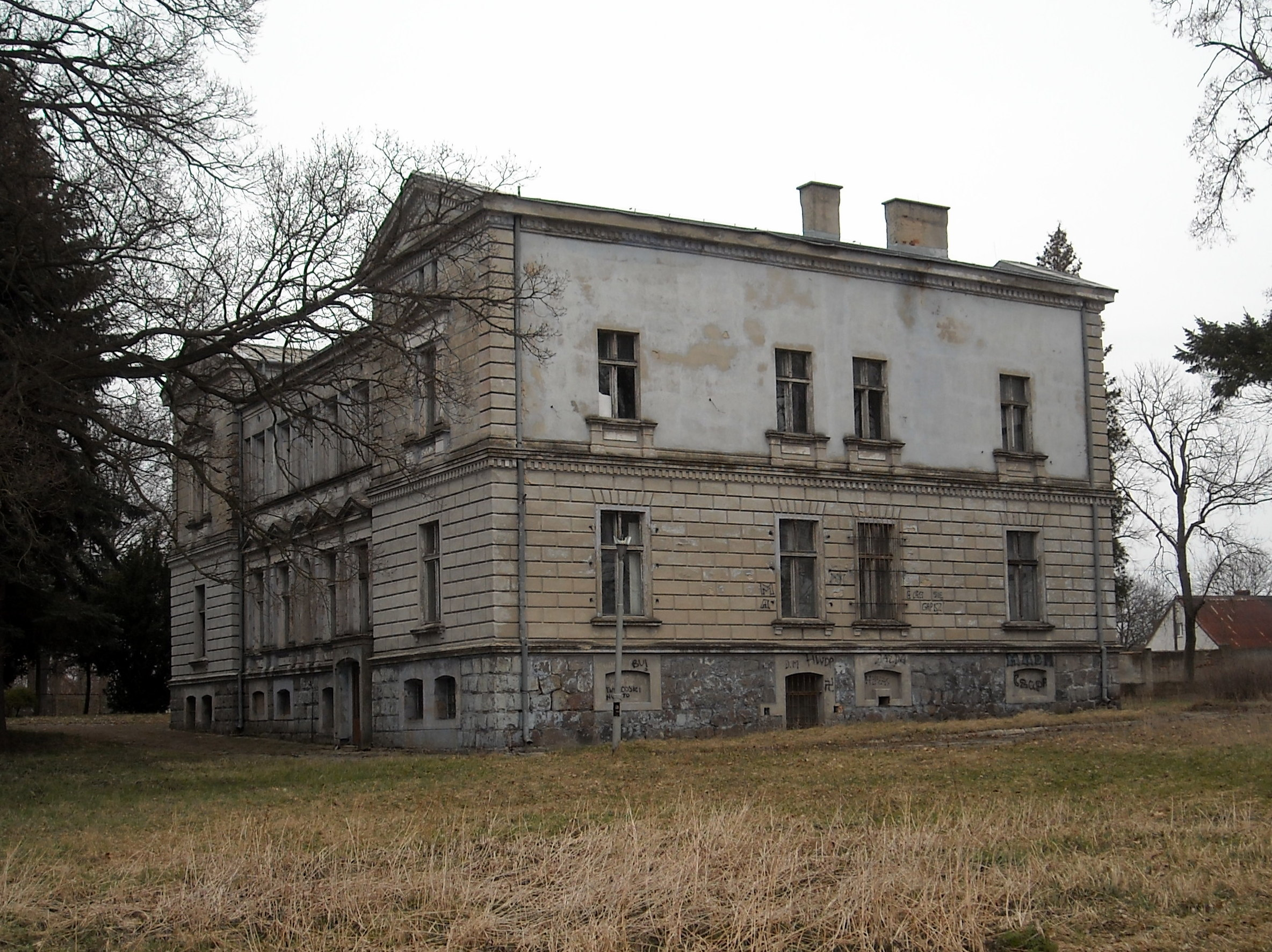
- Manor in Lubaszcz

- Location within Poland
- Coordinates: 53°08′44″N 17°31′32″E
- Country: Poland
- Voivodeship: Kuyavian-Pomeranian
- County: Nakło
- Gmina: Nakło nad Notecią

Lubaszcz [ˈlubaʂt͡ʂ] is a village in the administrative district of Gmina Nakło nad Notecią, within Nakło County, Kuyavian-Pomeranian Voivodeship, in north-central Poland.
