= Mary Theresa Dudzik =

Catholic nun

Mary Theresa Dudzik (August 30, 1860 – September 20, 1918) was an American Catholic religious sister who founded the Franciscan Sisters of Blessed Kunegunda. Today they are the Franciscan Sisters of Chicago.

== Biography ==
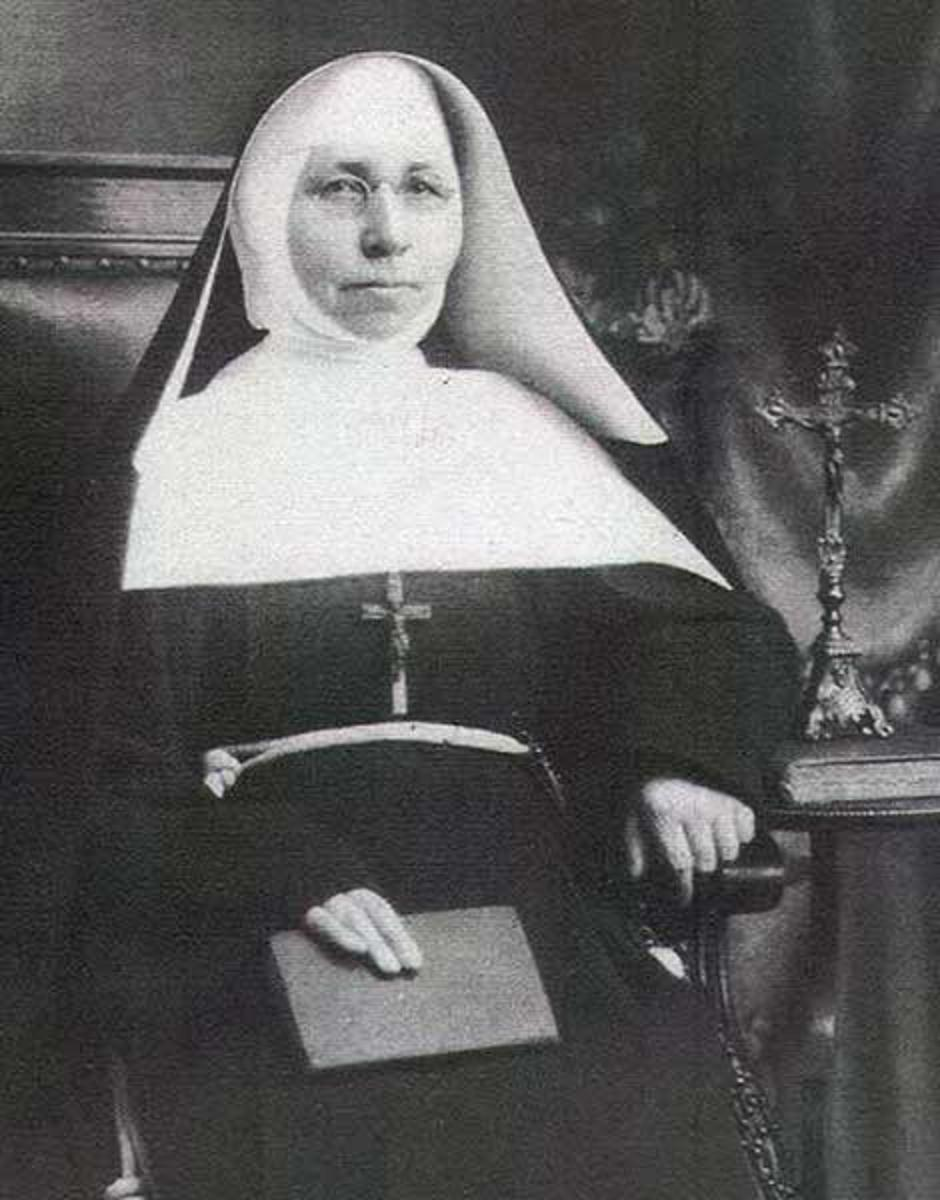
Maria Teresa Dudzik

=== Early years ===
Mary Theresa Dudzik was born as Josephine Dudzik on August 30, 1860, in Płocicz in the Kingdom of Prussia (present-day Poland). She was one of six children of John and Agnes Polascyk. Dudzik was baptized at the Church of the Immaculate Conception in Kamien Krajenski.

In 1881, the Polascyk family emigrated to Chicago, Illinois. They became members of St. Stanislaus Kostka Church, the premier Polish national parish in the Pulaski Park neighborhood, The pastor at the church was Wincenty Barzyński, a leader of the Polish-American community in Chicago.

Dudzik began working as a dressmaker in Chicago while also helping impoverished Polish-American widows. Over time she recruited other employed girls, setting aside money from their earnings to help the poor. They also spent time together in prayer sessions. The women in 1886 decided that they wanted live in celibacy in a communal life built around their Catholic faith. Dudzik and another woman found the Third Order Secular of St. Francis, a secular group, with Barzyński as their spiritual advisor.

After Dudzik's father died in 1889, she started bringing homeless people to live in her home. On occasions, Barzyński would bring a desperate individual to stay there. Around 1891, Dudzik told Barzyński that she and her colleagues would like to create a home for the poor and homeless. As a condition of giving his approval, he said that the women would need to transform the Third Order Secular into a religious order.

=== Franciscan Sisters of Blessed Kunegunda ===
Wincenty Barzyński

In 1893, Archbishop Patrick Feehan gave them permission to form the Franciscan Sisters of Blessed Kunegunda, in honor of the future St. Kunegunda. Dudzik took the religious name of Sister Theresa. The order was officially established in 1894, with Dudzik appointed by Barzyński as its superior. The Sisters funded their charitable activities through “cleaning, cooking, and sewing in rectories and homes”.

In 1895, with the financial support of the Sisters, Dudzik purchased a home in Chicago for the disabled and the elderly.She, along with her friends, generated the required funds for the charitable activities through “cleaning, cooking, and sewing in rectories and homes”. The St. Joseph Home for the Aged and Crippled, the first nursing home in Chicago, opened in 1898. St. Joseph also served as the mother house for the order. They opened the St. Vincent's Orphan Home in 1899 next to St. Joseph's

Dudzik and her sisters took their first vows to their order in 1900. In 1901, the order began sending sisters to teach immigrants from different ethnic groups in the parochial schools in the archdiocese. They opened a nursery school in Chicago in 1904.

In 1910, while Dudzik was fundraising for the order, unfounded rumors arose in the community that she was going to use the money for her personal benefit. To avoid scandal for the order, Barzyński suggested that Dudzik relinquish her role as superior. She agreed without hesitation and spent the remainder of her years in the background, sewing habits and gardening.

Dudzik died of cancer in Chicago on September 20, 1918.She was buried at St. Adalbert Cemetery in Niles, Illinois.

== Legacy ==
The Franciscan Sisters of Blessed Kunegunda in 1940 declared Dudzik to be the founder of the order and gave her the title of "mother".

The sisters in 1970 changed the name of their order from the Franciscan Sisters of Blessed Kunegunda to the Franciscan Sisters of Chicago.Henry Malak wrote several books and articles about her.

== Veneration ==
In 1963, Cardinal Albert Mayer officially opened the cause for canonization of Dudzik. Her remains were exhumed for examination in 1972 as part of the canonization cause process, then re-interred in a sarcophagus in the mother house of the order.

In 1973, a possible miracle occurred due to Dudzik's intercession. During a crash on the Illinois Central Railroad, Jerry Lisiecki was seriously injured and became comatose. Doctors said he would never wake up. His mother in 1973 took leaves from a poinsettia plant on Dudzik's sarcophagus and place them on her bedridden son. She then prayed a nine day-novena. Lisiecki came out of his coma on the ninth day.

Dudzik was declared a ‘Servant of God’ by the Vatican in 1982 and in 1994 Pope John Paul II declared her to be venerable. However, after theologians and doctors at the Vatican examined the Lisiecki case, they declared that it was not a miracle.

== See also ==
- List of venerated American Catholics
- Franciscans
