= Gabrielin =

- Village
- Location within Poland
- Coordinates: 53°10′28″N 17°40′35″E
- Country: Poland
- Voivodeship: Kuyavian-Pomeranian
- County: Nakło
- Gmina: Nakło nad Notecią

Gabrielin [ɡaˈbrjɛlin] is a village in the administrative district of Gmina Nakło nad Notecią, within Nakło County, Kuyavian-Pomeranian Voivodeship, in north-central Poland.
