= Janowo, Nakło County =

Janowo
- Village
- Location within Poland
- Coordinates: 53°06′10″N 17°38′41″E
- Country: Poland
- Voivodeship: Kuyavian-Pomeranian
- County: Nakło
- Gmina: Nakło nad Notecią

Janowo [jaˈnɔvɔ] is a village in the administrative district of Gmina Nakło nad Notecią, within Nakło County, Kuyavian-Pomeranian Voivodeship, in north-central Poland.
