= Rozwarzyn =

- Village
- Location within Poland
- Coordinates: 53°7′N 17°34′E
- Country: Poland
- Voivodeship: Kuyavian-Pomeranian
- County: Nakło
- Gmina: Nakło nad Notecią
- Time zone: UTC+1 (CET)
  - Summer (DST): UTC+2 (CEST)
- Vehicle registration: CNA

Rozwarzyn [rɔzˈvaʐɨn] is a village in the administrative district of Gmina Nakło nad Notecią, within Nakło County, Kuyavian-Pomeranian Voivodeship, in north-central Poland. It is located in the ethnographic region of Pałuki.

== History ==
During the German occupation (World War II), some Poles from Rozwarzyn were among the victims of a massacre carried out by the German Selbstschutz in nearby Polichno in October 1939 as part of the Intelligenzaktion.
