= Polichno, Kuyavian-Pomeranian Voivodeship =

Polichno
- Village
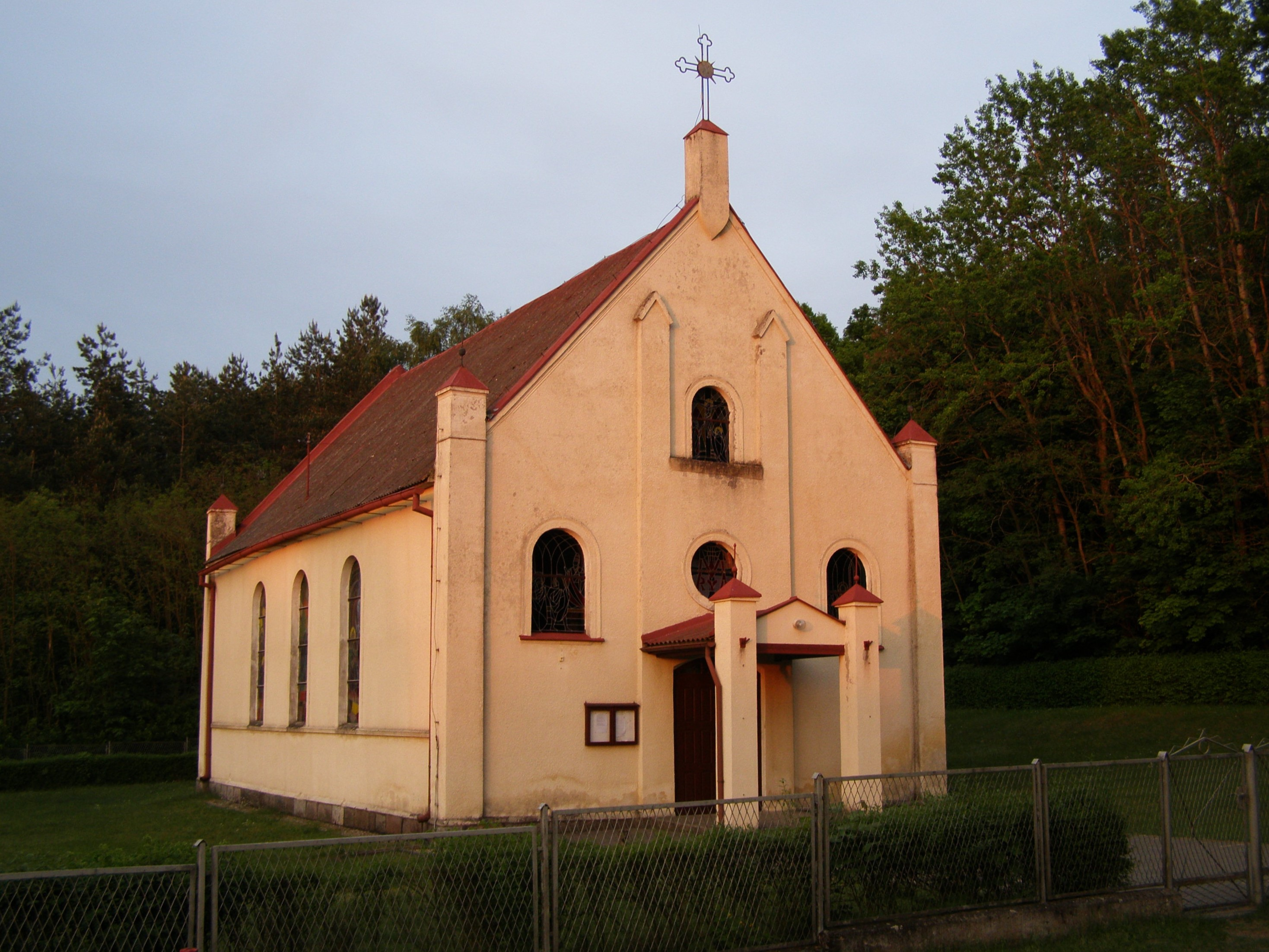
- Chapel of Our Lady of Częstochowa in Polichno

- Location within Poland
- Coordinates: 53°7′N 17°33′E
- Country: Poland
- Voivodeship: Kuyavian-Pomeranian
- County: Nakło
- Gmina: Nakło nad Notecią
- Time zone: UTC+1 (CET)
  - Summer (DST): UTC+2 (CEST)
- Vehicle registration: CNA

Polichno [pɔˈlixnɔ] is a village in the administrative district of Gmina Nakło nad Notecią, within Nakło County, Kuyavian-Pomeranian Voivodeship, in north-central Poland. It is located in the ethnographic region of Pałuki.

== History ==
Polichno was a royal village, administratively located in the Kcynia County in the Kalisz Voivodeship in the Greater Poland Province of the Polish Crown.

During the German occupation (World War II), in October 1939, the German Selbstschutz carried out a massacre of Poles from Polichno and nearby Rozwarzyn in the local forest as part of the Intelligenzaktion.
