= Dębowo, Nakło County =

Dębowo
- Village
- Location within Poland
- Coordinates: 53°11′N 17°29′E
- Country: Poland
- Voivodeship: Kuyavian-Pomeranian
- County: Nakło
- Gmina: Sadki
- Population: 651

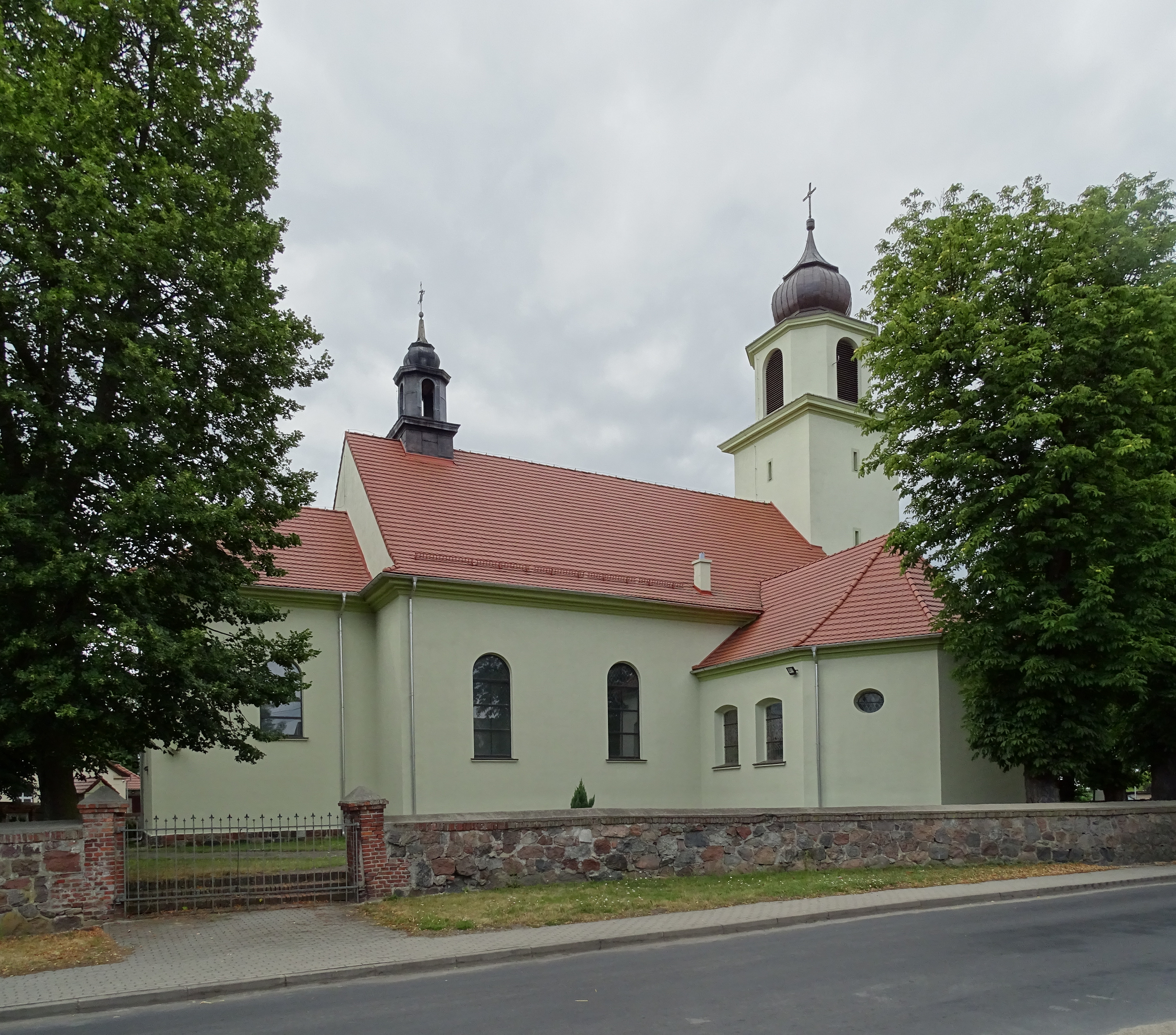
Church of St. Michael.

Dębowo [dɛmˈbɔvɔ] is a village in the administrative district of Gmina Sadki, within Nakło County, Kuyavian-Pomeranian Voivodeship, in north-central Poland.
