= Glinki, Nakło County =

Glinki
- Village
- Location within Poland
- Coordinates: 53°13′08″N 17°22′49″E
- Country: Poland
- Voivodeship: Kuyavian-Pomeranian
- County: Nakło
- Gmina: Sadki

Glinki [ˈɡlinki] is a village in the administrative district of Gmina Sadki, within Nakło County, Kuyavian-Pomeranian Voivodeship, in north-central Poland.
