= Suchary, Kuyavian-Pomeranian Voivodeship =

Suchary
- Village
- Location within Poland
- Coordinates: 53°11′N 17°39′E
- Country: Poland
- Voivodeship: Kuyavian-Pomeranian
- County: Nakło
- Gmina: Nakło nad Notecią
- Population: 340

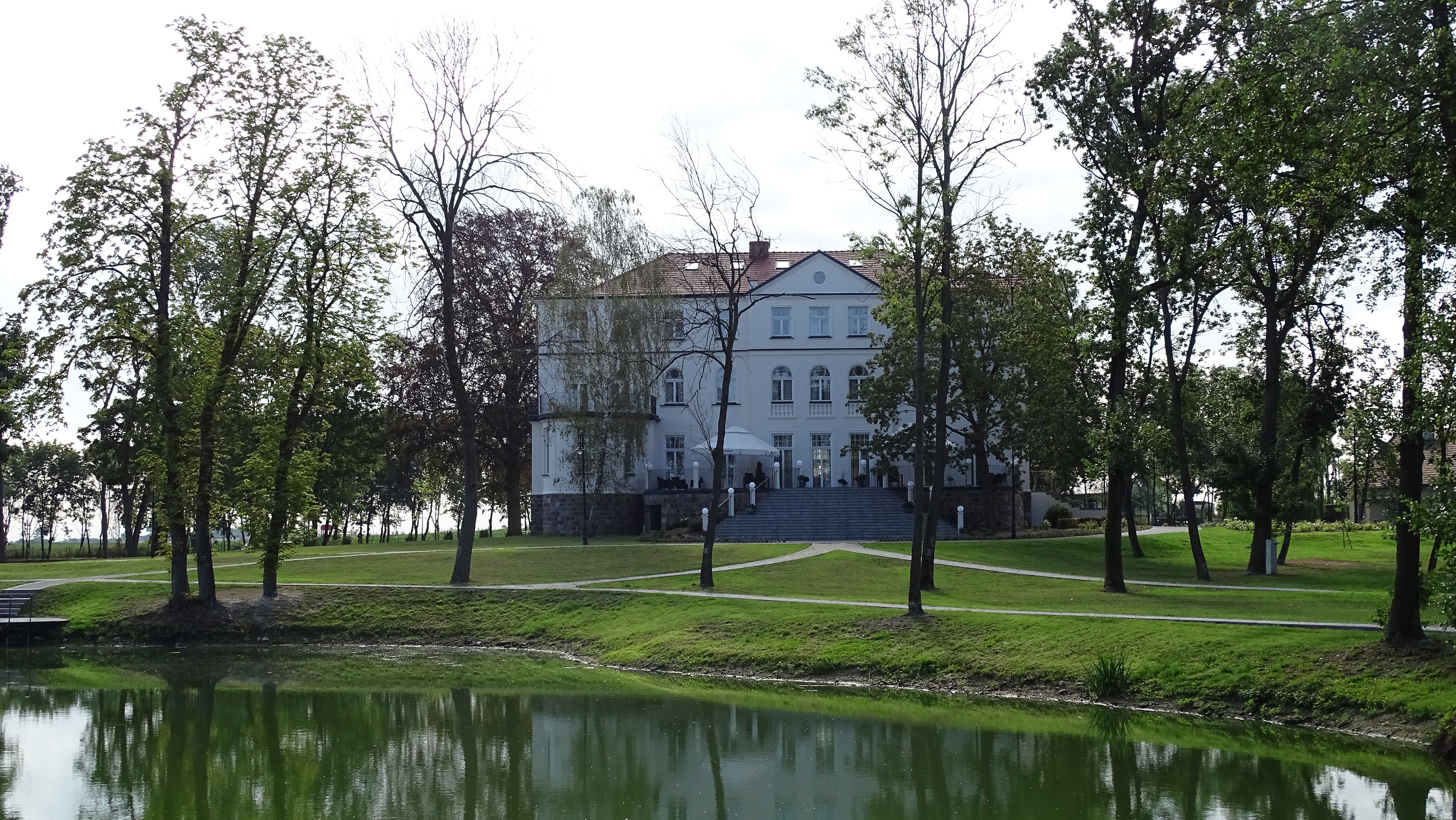
The palace in Suchary.

Suchary [suˈxarɨ] is a village in the administrative district of Gmina Nakło nad Notecią, within Nakło County, Kuyavian-Pomeranian Voivodeship, in north-central Poland.
