= Elżbiecin, Kuyavian-Pomeranian Voivodeship =

Elżbiecin
- Village
- Location within Poland
- Coordinates: 53°07′56″N 17°42′34″E
- Country: Poland
- Voivodeship: Kuyavian-Pomeranian
- County: Nakło
- Gmina: Nakło nad Notecią

Elżbiecin [ɛlʐˈbjɛt͡ɕin] is a village in the administrative district of Gmina Nakło nad Notecią, within Nakło County, Kuyavian-Pomeranian Voivodeship, in north-central Poland.
