= Broniewo, Nakło County =

Broniewo
- Village
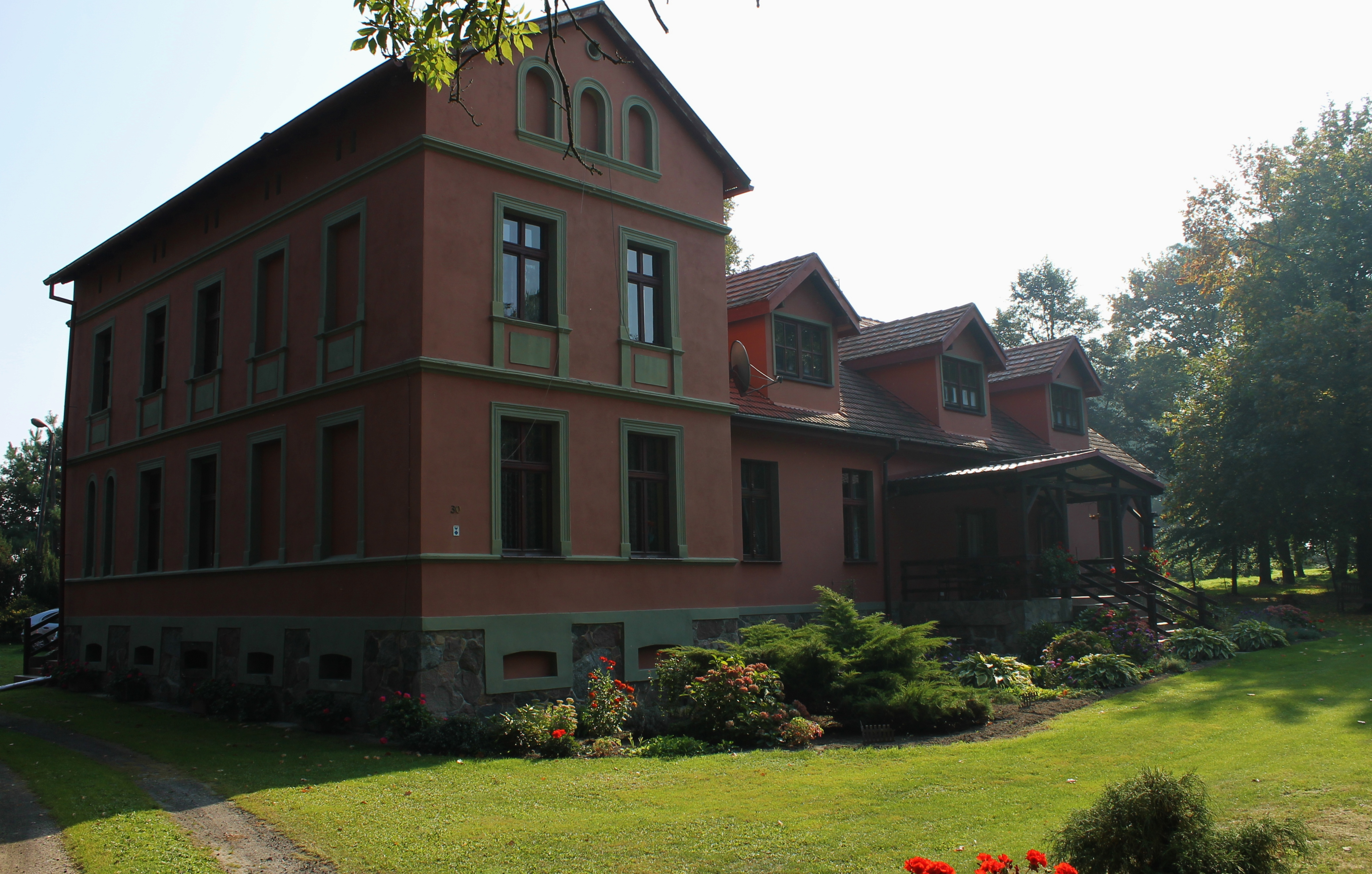
- Manor house in Broniewo

- Location within Poland
- Coordinates: 53°13′N 17°30′E
- Country: Poland
- Voivodeship: Kuyavian-Pomeranian
- County: Nakło
- Gmina: Sadki

Population
  - Total: 248

Broniewo [brɔˈɲɛvɔ] is a village in the administrative district of Gmina Sadki, within Nakło County, Kuyavian-Pomeranian Voivodeship, in north-central Poland.
