= Paterek =

- Village
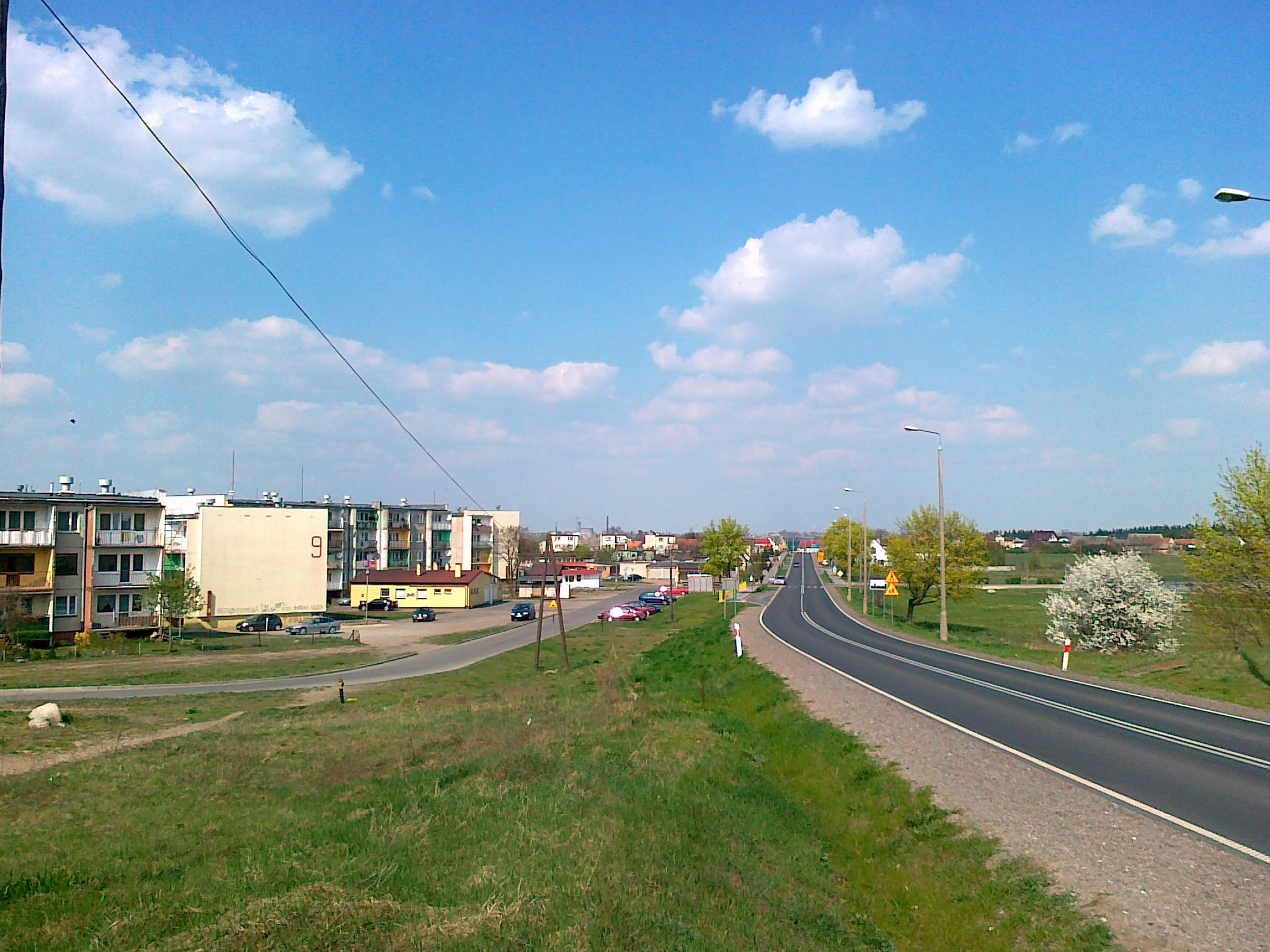

- Location within Poland
- Coordinates: 53°7′N 17°37′E
- Country: Poland
- Voivodeship: Kuyavian-Pomeranian
- County: Nakło
- Gmina: Nakło nad Notecią
- First mentioned: 1720
- Population: 2,300
- Time zone: UTC+1 (CET)
  - Summer (DST): UTC+2 (CEST)
- Vehicle registration: CNA

Paterek [paˈtɛrɛk] is a village in the administrative district of Gmina Nakło nad Notecią, within Nakło County, Kuyavian-Pomeranian Voivodeship, in north-central Poland. It is located in the region of Pałuki.

== History ==
The oldest known mention of Paterek dates back to a 1720 document of Polish King Augustus II the Strong.

During the German occupation of Poland (World War II) it was the site of the Paterek massacre, in which over 200 Poles, including teachers, craftsmen, merchants, priests and entire families with children, were murdered by the Germans in October and November 1939 during the Intelligenzaktion.
