= Występ, Kuyavian-Pomeranian Voivodeship =

Występ
- Village
- Location within Poland
- Coordinates: 53°7′30″N 17°38′58″E
- Country: Poland
- Voivodeship: Kuyavian-Pomeranian
- County: Nakło
- Gmina: Nakło nad Notecią
- Population: 1,900
- Website: www.wystep.pl

Występ [ˈvɨstɛmp] is a village in the administrative district of Gmina Nakło nad Notecią, within Nakło County, Kuyavian-Pomeranian Voivodeship, in north-central Poland.
