= Minikowo, Nakło County =

Minikowo
- Village
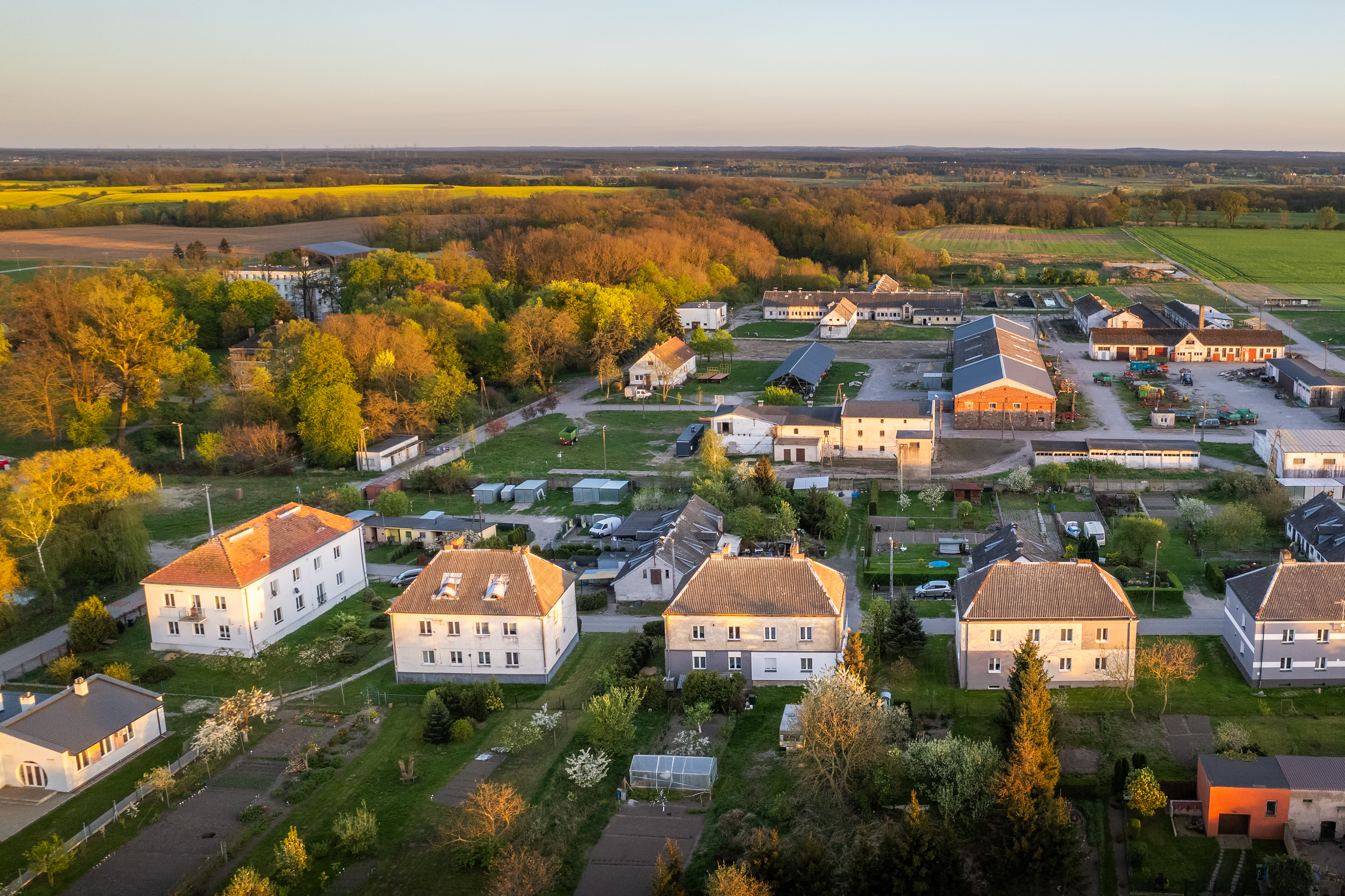
- Drone view

- Location within Poland
- Coordinates: 53°10′2″N 17°44′22″E
- Country: Poland
- Voivodeship: Kuyavian-Pomeranian
- County: Nakło
- Gmina: Nakło nad Notecią
- Population: 489

Minikowo [miniˈkɔvɔ] is a village in the administrative district of Gmina Nakło nad Notecią, within Nakło County, Kuyavian-Pomeranian Voivodeship, in north-central Poland.
