= Sadki, Kuyavian-Pomeranian Voivodeship =

Sadki
- Village
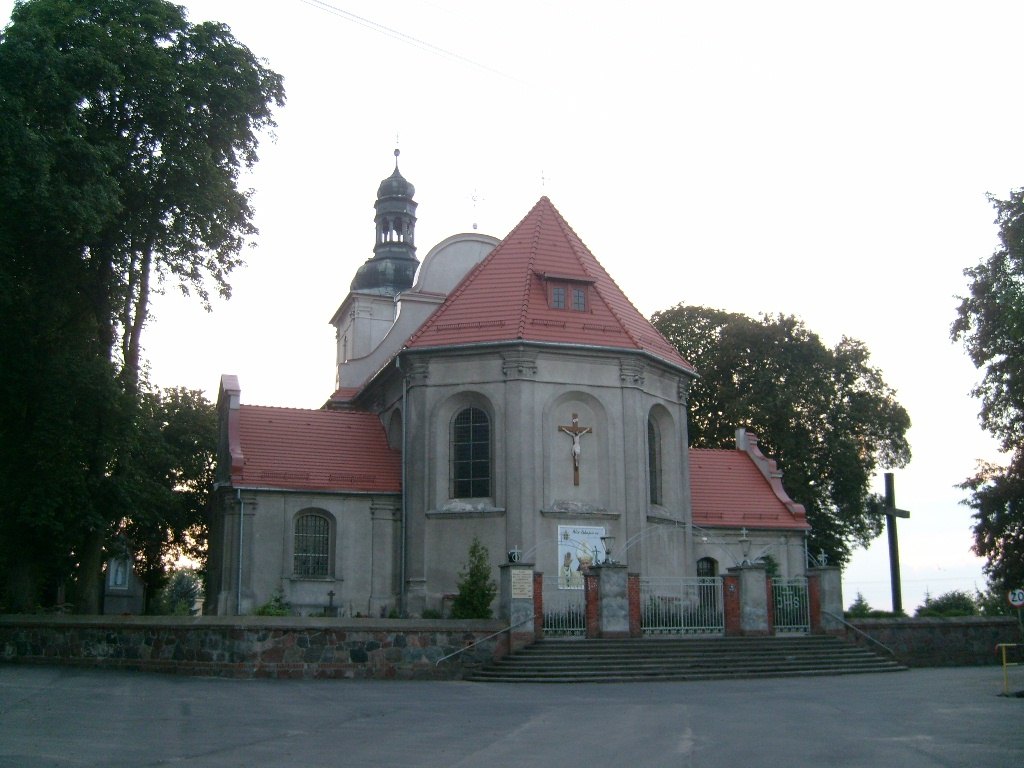
- Church of Saint Adalbert

- Location within Poland
- Coordinates: 53°9′41″N 17°26′46″E
- Country: Poland
- Voivodeship: Kuyavian-Pomeranian
- County: Nakło
- Gmina: Sadki
- Elevation: 90 m (300 ft)

Population (approx.)
  - Total: 2,000
- Time zone: UTC+1 (CET)
  - Summer (DST): UTC+2 (CEST)
- Vehicle registration: CNA
- Website: http://www.sadki.pl

Sadki [ˈsatki] is a village in Nakło County, Kuyavian-Pomeranian Voivodeship, in north-central Poland. It is the seat of the gmina (administrative district) called Gmina Sadki.

== History ==
The area formed part of Poland since the establishment of the state in the 10th century. Sadki was a royal village, administratively located in the Nakło County in the Kalisz Voivodeship in the Greater Poland Province of the Kingdom of Poland. The village was annexed by Prussia in the late-18th-century Partitions of Poland, and was also part of Germany from 1871. Following World War I, Poland regained independence and control of the village.

During the German occupation of Poland (World War II), the local forest was the site of executions of 86 Poles from Sadki and other nearby villages, perpetrated by the SS and Selbstschutz in October and November 1939 as part of the Intelligenzaktion.

== Sports ==
The local football club is GLZS Sadki. It competes in the lower leagues.

== Notable people ==
- Rev. Henryk Malak (1912–1987), Polish Roman Catholic priest arrested by the Nazis and incarcerated in Nazi concentration camps during World War II
