= Gabin =

Gabin may refer to:

== People ==
- Gabin (surname)
- Saint Gabinus, name of two Christian martyrs
- Gabin Dabiré, Burkinabé musician
- Jean-Gabin Moubeke (born 1982), Ivorian footballer

== Music ==
- Gabin (Italian band)
- Gabin, a Mirmo! character

== Places ==
- Gąbin, a town in Poland
- Gąbin, Kuyavian-Pomeranian Voivodeship, a village in north-central Poland
- Gąbin, West Pomeranian Voivodeship, a village in north-west Poland
- Gąbin, the Polish name for Gusev, Kaliningrad Oblast, Russia
