= Kreis Schubin =

Coordinates: 53°00′34″N 17°44′24″E

Location of Kreis Schubin (1913)

Kreis Schubin was one of many Kreise (counties) in the northern administrative region of Bromberg, in the Prussian province of Posen, from 1815 to 1919. Its capital was Schubin (Szubin).

== History ==
The territory was created as part of the Grand Duchy of Posen (1815-1848, in personal union with Prussia) and later was part of the Prussian Province of Posen (1848-1919). On January 18, 1871, Kreis Schubin, along with all of Prussia, became part of Germany. The county's territory was reduced significantly in 1887 when the southern half of Kreis Schubin was used to create the new Kreis Znin.

Kreis Schubin was part of the military command (German: Bezirkskommando) at Hohensalza. The main court (German: Landgericht) was in Bromberg, with lower courts (German: Amtsgericht) in Schubin, Exin, and Labischin.

The Kreis was dissolved in 1919 when the territory became part of the Second Polish Republic. During World War II, the territory of the former Kreis became Landkreis Altburgund in Reichsgau Wartheland from 1939 to 1945.

== Demographics ==
Ethnolinguistic structure
	1890		1910	
German	20,130	45.38%	21,035	43.55%
Polish	23,975	54.05%	26,799	55.48%
Bilingual	248	0.56%	403	0.83%
Total	44,360		48,304	

== Standesämter ==
Standesamt is the German name of the local civil registration offices which were established in October 1874 soon after the German Empire was formed. Births, marriages and deaths were recorded. Previously, only duplicate copies of church records were used. By 1905, Kreis Schubin had the following 14 offices for rural residents:

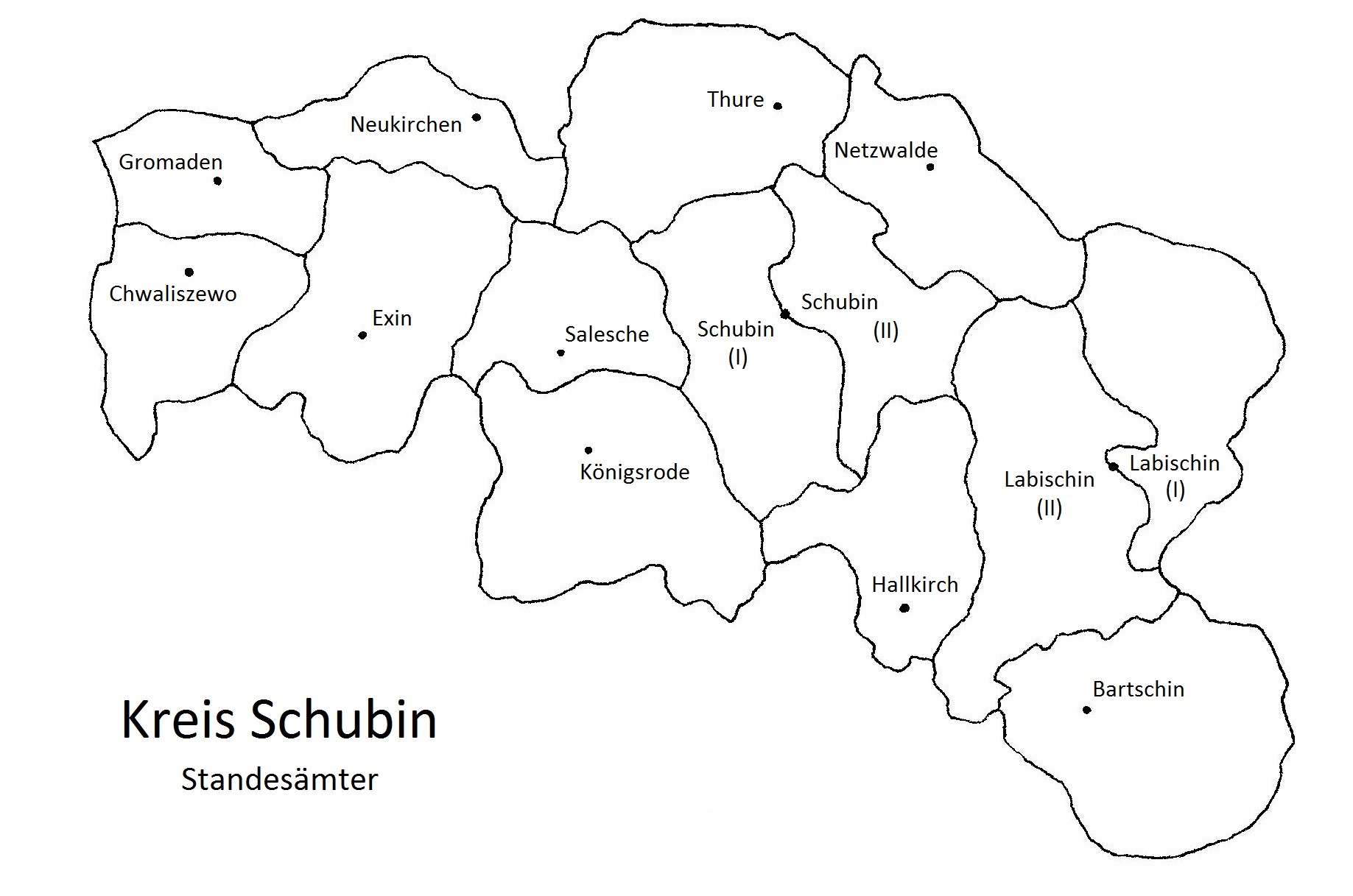
The standesämter districts of Kreis Schubin, Provinz Posen, Prussia/Germany

Standesamt	Polish Name
Bartschin	Barcin
Chwaliszewo	Chwaliszewo
Exin	Kcynia
Gromaden	Gromadno
Hallkirch	Jabłówko
Königsrode	Królikowo
Labischin(I&II)	Łabiszyn
Netzwalde	Rynarzewo
Neukirchen	Sipiory
Salesche	Zalesie
Schubin(I&II)	Szubin
Thure	Tur

Tur district was created in 1884 from parts of Netzwalde and Schubin districts. In addition, the following cities were separate districts for urban residents: Bartschin, Exin, Labischin, Schubin.
