= Szubin (disambiguation) =

Szubin may refer to:

== Places ==
- Szubin, a town in Nakło County, Kuyavian-Pomeranian Voivodeship, Poland, located southwest of Bydgoszcz.
- Gmina Szubin, or Szubin Commune, an urban-rural gmina (administrative district) in Nakło County, Kuyavian-Pomeranian Voivodeship, in north-central Poland
- Szubin-Wieś, a village in the administrative district of Gmina Szubin, within Nakło County, Kuyavian-Pomeranian Voivodeship, in north-central Poland

== Persons ==
- Adam Szubin, American politician, served as US Secretary of the Treasury of the United States

== See also ==
- Szubina, a village in the administrative district of Gmina Krośniewice, within Kutno County, Łódź Voivodeship, in central Poland
- Szubinianka Szubin, a football club from Szubin, Poland
