= Łabiszyn =

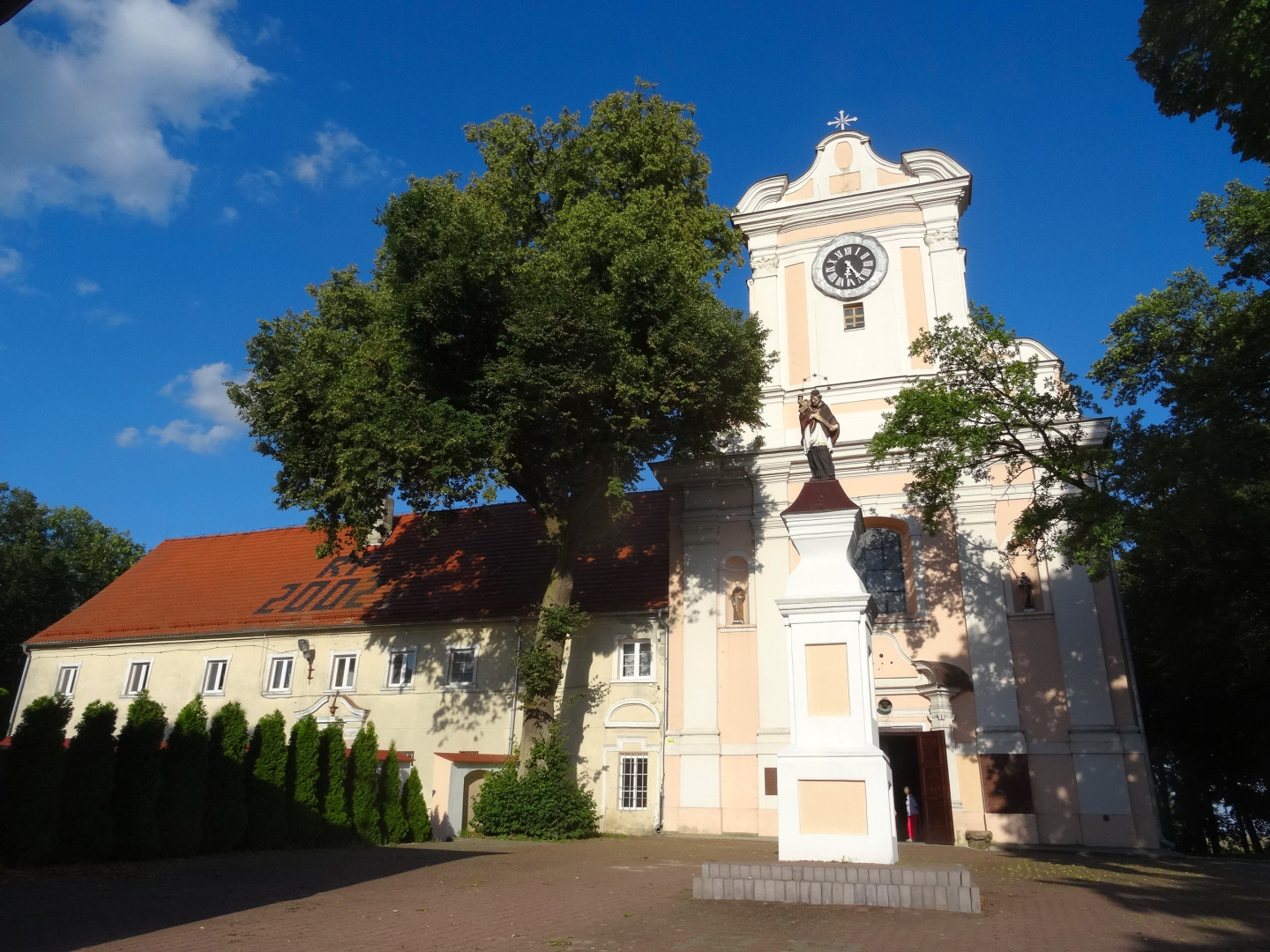
- Baroque Saint Nicholas church in Łabiszyn

- Flag Coat of arms

- Location within Poland
- Coordinates: 52°57′11″N 17°54′52″E
- Country: Poland
- Voivodeship: Kuyavian-Pomeranian
- County: Żnin
- Gmina: Łabiszyn
- Town rights: 1369

Area
  - Total: 2.89 km^{2} (1.12 sq mi)

Population (2010)
  - Total: 4,452
  - Density: 1,540/km^{2} (3,990/sq mi)
- Time zone: UTC+1 (CET)
  - Summer (DST): UTC+2 (CEST)
- Postal code: 89-210
- Vehicle registration: CZN
- Primary airport: Bydgoszcz Ignacy Jan Paderewski Airport
- Website: http://www.labiszyn.pl

Łabiszyn [waˈbʲiʂɨn] is a small town in Żnin County, in the Kuyavian-Pomeranian Voivodeship in Poland, with 4,452 inhabitants (2010). It is located on the Noteć river near Żnin, on the border between the historic regions of Pałuki and Kuyavia.

== History ==
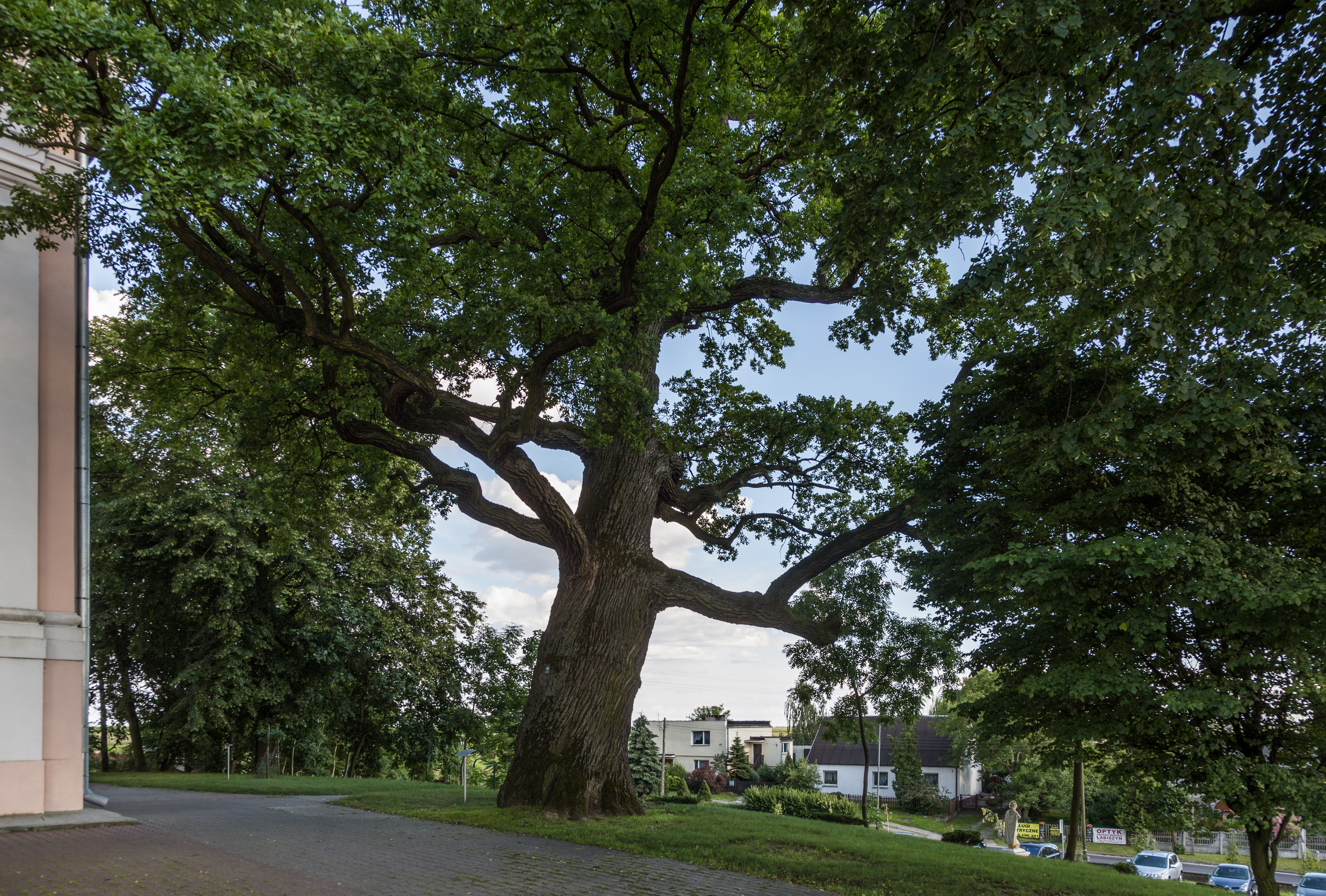
Jagiełło Oak

The first written mention of Łabiszyn comes from the 13th century as an estate owned by a knight, located within medieval Piast-ruled Poland. A document from 1247 mentions Dezydery of Łabiszyn, probably the owner of the settlement. In 1362 the village is mentioned as Labissino and Lambissiono. In the 14th century, Łabiszyn belonged to the Prawdzic family. Thanks to their efforts, the settlement and the castle were granted town rights in 1369. In 1407, the town already had its own wax seal with the coat of arms depicting the right, open and severed hand with the inscription "Łabiszyn". King Władysław Jagiełło passed through Łabiszyn on November 2, 1410 , on his way from Inowrocław to Szubin after the victorious Battle of Koronowo. According to tradition, Jagiełło planted two oaks on the Łabiszyński Hill, one of which has survived to this day.

Łabiszyn was a private town, administratively located in the Kcynia County in the Kalisz Voivodeship in the Greater Poland Province. In the years 1604-1610, the owner of the town with the castle and the surrounding villages was Andrzej Czarnkowski, the voivode of Kalisz. From the 16th to the 19th century, the town was owned by the Czarnkowski, Opaliński, Gembicki and Skórzewski families. In 1678, the castellan Paweł Gembicki confirmed the town rights for Łabiszyn. In the 17th and 18th centuries, the town was devastated by fires and plagues. With the annexation of the town by Prussia in the late 18th-century Partitions of Poland, Protestant clothiers from German states began to arrive. On September 30, 1794, during the Kościuszko Uprising, the troops of General Henryk Dąbrowski defeated the Prussian army near Łabiszyn and captured the town, which was defended by the Prussian garrison of Lieutenant Beyer. After the successful Greater Poland uprising of 1806, it was regained by Poles and included within the short-lived Duchy of Warsaw, and then re-annexed by Prussia after the duchy's dissolution in 1815. Another battle between Polish insurgents and the Prussian army near Łabiszyn took place in 1848, during the Greater Poland uprising, as part of the Revolutions of 1848.

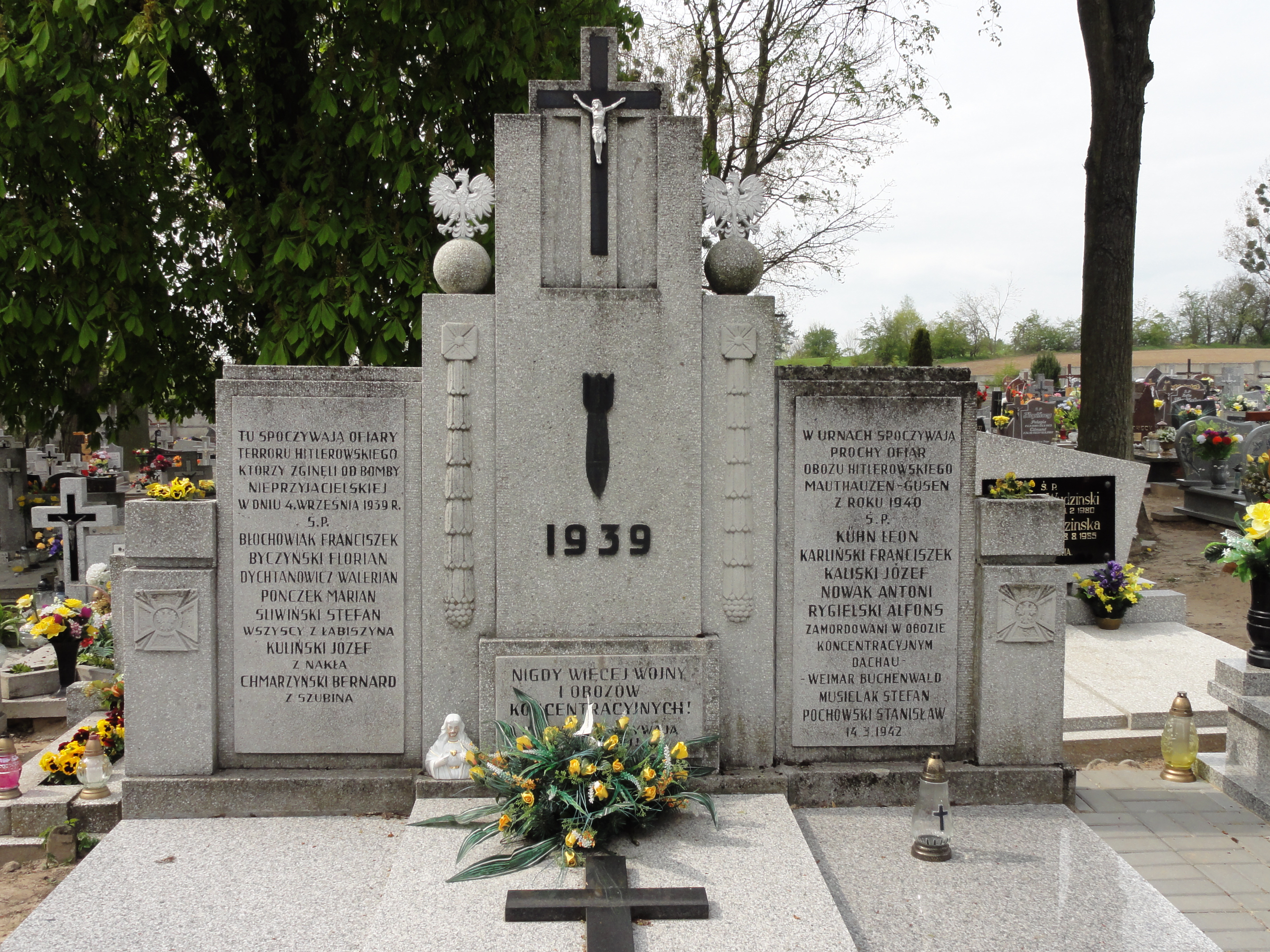
Mass grave of Poles killed in a German air raid in September 1939 and murdered in German concentration camps during World War II

Under Prussian rule, the town was part of Kreis Schubin in the Province of Posen until 1919. It was also part of the German Empire from 1871. According to the German census of 1890, the town had a population of 2,328, of which 900 (38.7%) were Poles. In the aftermath of World War I, the town's inhabitants played an important role in the Greater Poland uprising (1918-1919). In 1919, the Łabiszyn insurgents won a decisive victory against the Germans and the town became part of the newly established Second Polish Republic. Within interwar Poland, the town was initially located in the Poznań Voivodeship and then in the Pomeranian Voivodeship.

After the German-Soviet invasion of Poland, which started World War II in September 1939, the town was invaded and occupied by Nazi Germany. Łabiszyn was one of the sites of executions of Poles carried out by Germany in 1939 as part of the Intelligenzaktion. In 1940, the Germans renamed the town Lüderitz, in memory of Adolf Lüderitz, founder of the German South West Africa colony. Towards the end of World War II in 1945, the town was captured by the Red Army and restored to Poland.

== Transport ==
Łabiszyn lies within a ring consisting of voivodeship roads 254, 253 and 246.

The nearest railway station is Brzoza Bydgoska.

== Demographics ==
Historical population
Year	Pop.	±%
1890	2,328	—
1921	1,834	−21.2%
1931	2,464	+34.4%
2010	4,452	+80.7%
