= Gąsawka =

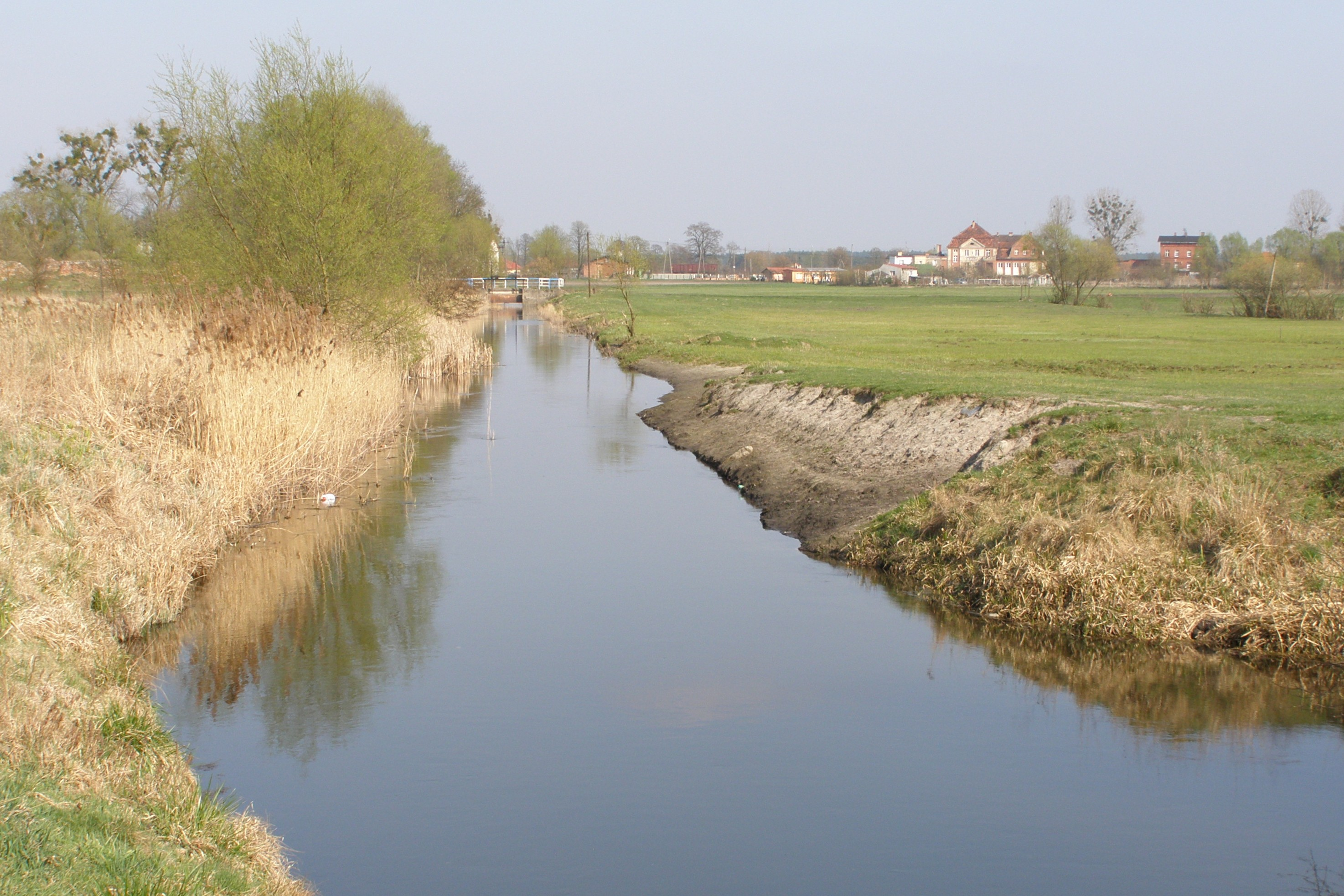
- Gąsawka near Szubin

Location
- Country: Poland
- Voivodeship: Kuyavian–Pomeranian

Physical characteristics
- Source: Głęboczek Wielki (lake)
  - location: north of Głęboczek, Mogilno County
  - coordinates: 52°42′01.0″N 17°48′19.0″E
- Mouth: Noteć
  - location: northwest of Rynarzewo, Nakło County
  - coordinates: 53°04′02″N 17°48′15″E
  - elevation: 61.9 m (203 ft)
- Length: 56.97 km (35.40 mi)

Basin features
- Progression: Noteć→ Warta→ Oder→ Baltic Sea

Gąsawka is a river of Poland, a tributary of the Noteć near Rynarzewo.
