= Samoklęski Małe =

- Village
- Location within Poland
- Coordinates: 53°4′N 17°43′E
- Country: Poland
- Voivodeship: Kuyavian-Pomeranian
- County: Nakło
- Gmina: Szubin
- Population: 147
- Time zone: UTC+1 (CET)
  - Summer (DST): UTC+2 (CEST)
- Vehicle registration: CNA

Samoklęski Małe [samɔˈklɛ̃ski ˈmawɛ] is a village in the administrative district of Gmina Szubin, within Nakło County, Kuyavian-Pomeranian Voivodeship, in north-central Poland.

== History ==
Samoklęski Małe was a private village of Polish nobility, administratively located in the Kcynia County in the Kalisz Voivodeship in the Greater Poland Province of the Polish Crown.

During the German occupation of Poland (World War II), in 1939, the German gendarmerie and Selbstschutz expelled several Polish families from the village. Expelled Poles were initially detained in a transit camp in nearby Szubin, and then deported to the Radom District of the General Government (German-occupied central Poland), while their houses and farms were handed over to Germans as part of the Lebensraum policy. One child died during the expulsion.
