= Crozier head =

Heraldic ordinary

Example of the crozier head in the escutcheon.

Crozier head (Note: Polish: krzywaśń) is an heraldic ordinary in the shape of the reversed letter S, symbolizing the river.

== History ==
It was used in the several coats of arms of heraldic clans of Poland, including: Drużyna, Srzeniawa, and Kopaszyna. It also is used in the coat of arms of Szydłowiec and Nowy Wiśnicz Until 1934, it was used in the coat of arms of Rynarzewo until 1934.

== Gallery ==
Drużyna coat of arms.

Srzeniawa coat of arms.

Kopaszyna coat of arms.

Coat of arms of Szydłowiec.

Coat of arms of Nowy Wiśnicz.

Coat of arms of Rynarzewo until 1934.

== Citations ==
=== Bibliography ===
- Tadeusz Gajl, Herbarz polski od średniowiecza do XX wieku: ponad 4500 herbów szlacheckich 37 tysięcy nazwisk 55 tysięcy rodów. L&L, 2007. ISBN 978-83-60597-10-1.
