= Suchy Pies =

- Village
- Location within Poland
- Coordinates: 53°2′42″N 17°40′46″E
- Country: Poland
- Voivodeship: Kuyavian-Pomeranian
- County: Nakło
- Gmina: Szubin

Suchy Pies [ˈsuxɨ ˈpjɛs] is a village in the administrative district of Gmina Szubin, within Nakło County, Kuyavian-Pomeranian Voivodeship, in north-central Poland.
