= Grzeczna Panna =

- Village
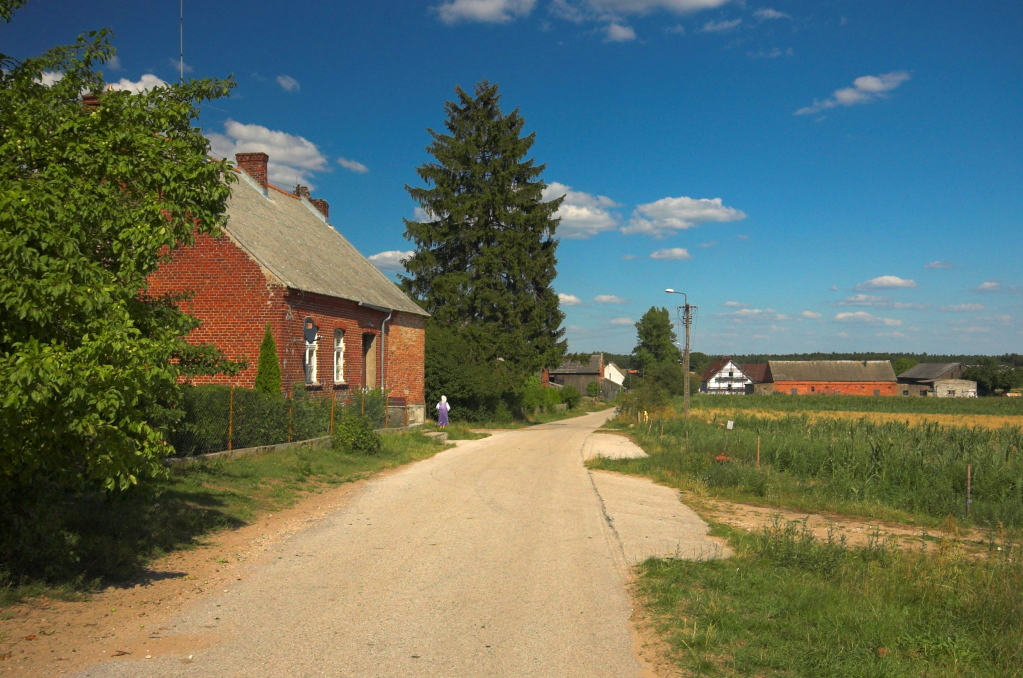
- Grzeczna Panna

- Location within Poland
- Coordinates: 53°2′11″N 17°41′5″E
- Country: Poland
- Voivodeship: Kuyavian-Pomeranian
- County: Nakło
- Gmina: Szubin
- Population: 75

Grzeczna Panna [ˈɡʐɛt͡ʂna ˈpanna] (translation: Polite Miss) is a village in the administrative district of Gmina Szubin, within Nakło County, Kuyavian-Pomeranian Voivodeship, in north-central Poland.
