= Chomętowo =

Chomętowo may refer to the following places:

- Chomętowo, Kuyavian-Pomeranian Voivodeship (north-central Poland)
- Chomętowo, Lubusz Voivodeship (west Poland)
- Chomętowo, Masovian Voivodeship (east-central Poland)
- Chomętowo, Choszczno County in West Pomeranian Voivodeship (north-west Poland)
- Chomętowo, Gryfice County in West Pomeranian Voivodeship (north-west Poland)
- Chomętowo, Świdwin County in West Pomeranian Voivodeship (north-west Poland)
