= Drogosław, Kuyavian-Pomeranian Voivodeship =

Drogosław
- Village
- Location within Poland
- Coordinates: 53°1′N 17°52′E
- Country: Poland
- Voivodeship: Kuyavian-Pomeranian
- County: Nakło
- Gmina: Szubin
- Population: 51

Drogosław [drɔˈɡɔswaf] is a village in the administrative district of Gmina Szubin, within Nakło County, Kuyavian-Pomeranian Voivodeship, in north-central Poland.
