= Słupy =

Słupy may refer to the following places:

- Słupy, Nakło County in Kuyavian-Pomeranian Voivodeship (north-central Poland)
- Słupy, Tuchola County in Kuyavian-Pomeranian Voivodeship (north-central Poland)
- Słupy, Warmian-Masurian Voivodeship (north Poland)
