= Wrzosy, Kuyavian-Pomeranian Voivodeship =

Wrzosy
- Village
- Location within Poland
- Coordinates: 52°55′45″N 17°39′50″E
- Country: Poland
- Voivodeship: Kuyavian-Pomeranian
- County: Nakło
- Gmina: Szubin
- Population: 72

Wrzosy [ˈvʐɔsɨ] is a village in the administrative district of Gmina Szubin, within Nakło County, Kuyavian-Pomeranian Voivodeship, in north-central Poland.
