= Bielawy, Gmina Szubin =

Bielawy
- Village
- Location within Poland
- Coordinates: 53°5′42″N 17°49′7″E
- Country: Poland
- Voivodeship: Kuyavian-Pomeranian
- County: Nakło
- Gmina: Szubin
- Population: 28

Bielawy ([bjɛˈlavɨ]; German: Bielawy, 1940–45 Luisenwalde) is a village in the administrative district of Gmina Szubin, within Nakło County, Kuyavian-Pomeranian Voivodeship, in north-central Poland.
