= Samoklęski Duże =

- Village
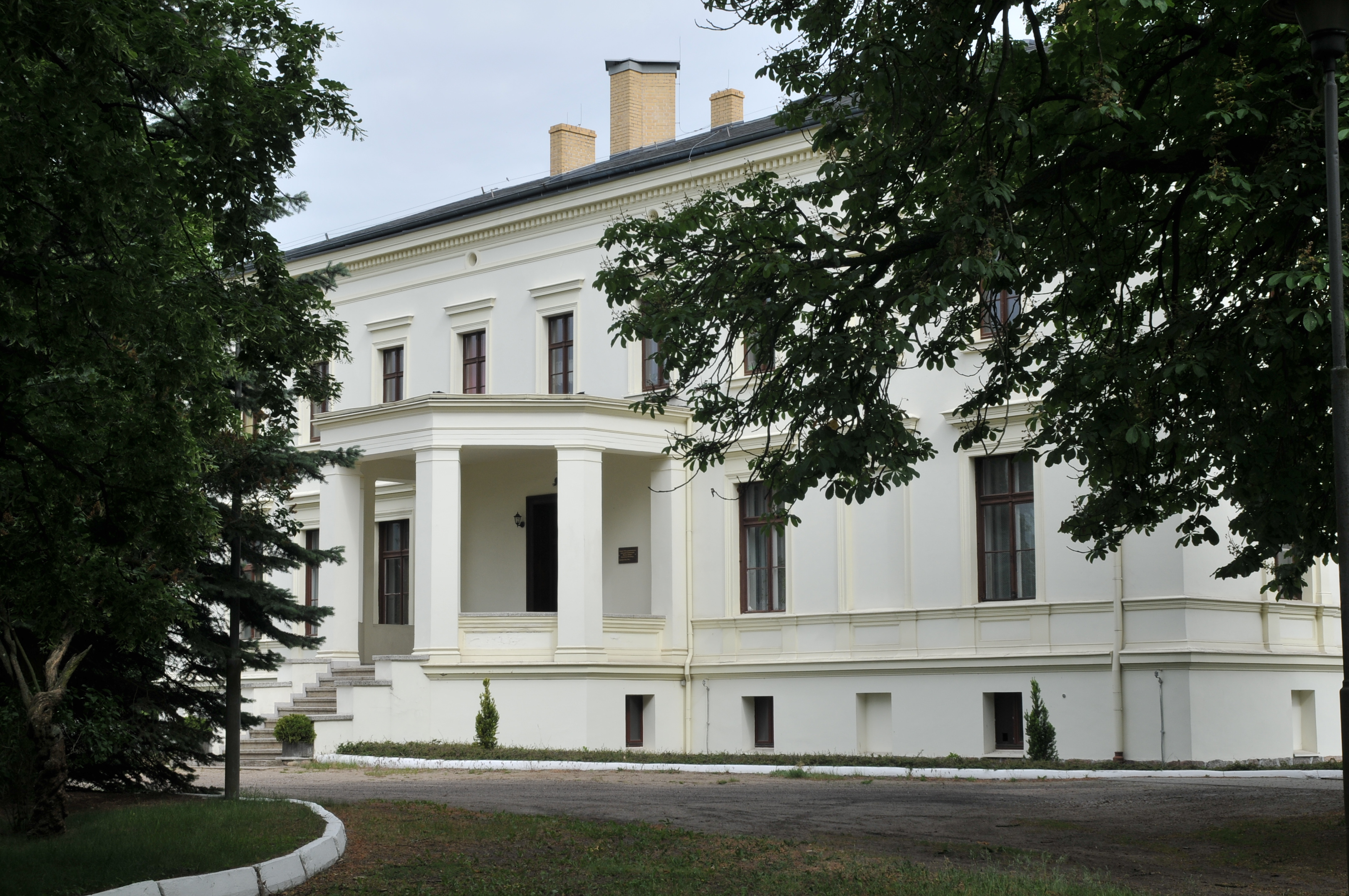
- Palace in Samoklęski Duże

- Location within Poland
- Coordinates: 53°5′N 17°42′E
- Country: Poland
- Voivodeship: Kuyavian-Pomeranian
- County: Nakło
- Gmina: Szubin
- First mentioned: 1337
- Population: 493
- Time zone: UTC+1 (CET)
  - Summer (DST): UTC+2 (CEST)
- Vehicle registration: CNA

Samoklęski Duże [samɔˈklɛ̃ski ˈduʐɛ] is a village in the administrative district of Gmina Szubin, within Nakło County, Kuyavian-Pomeranian Voivodeship, in north-central Poland.

== History ==
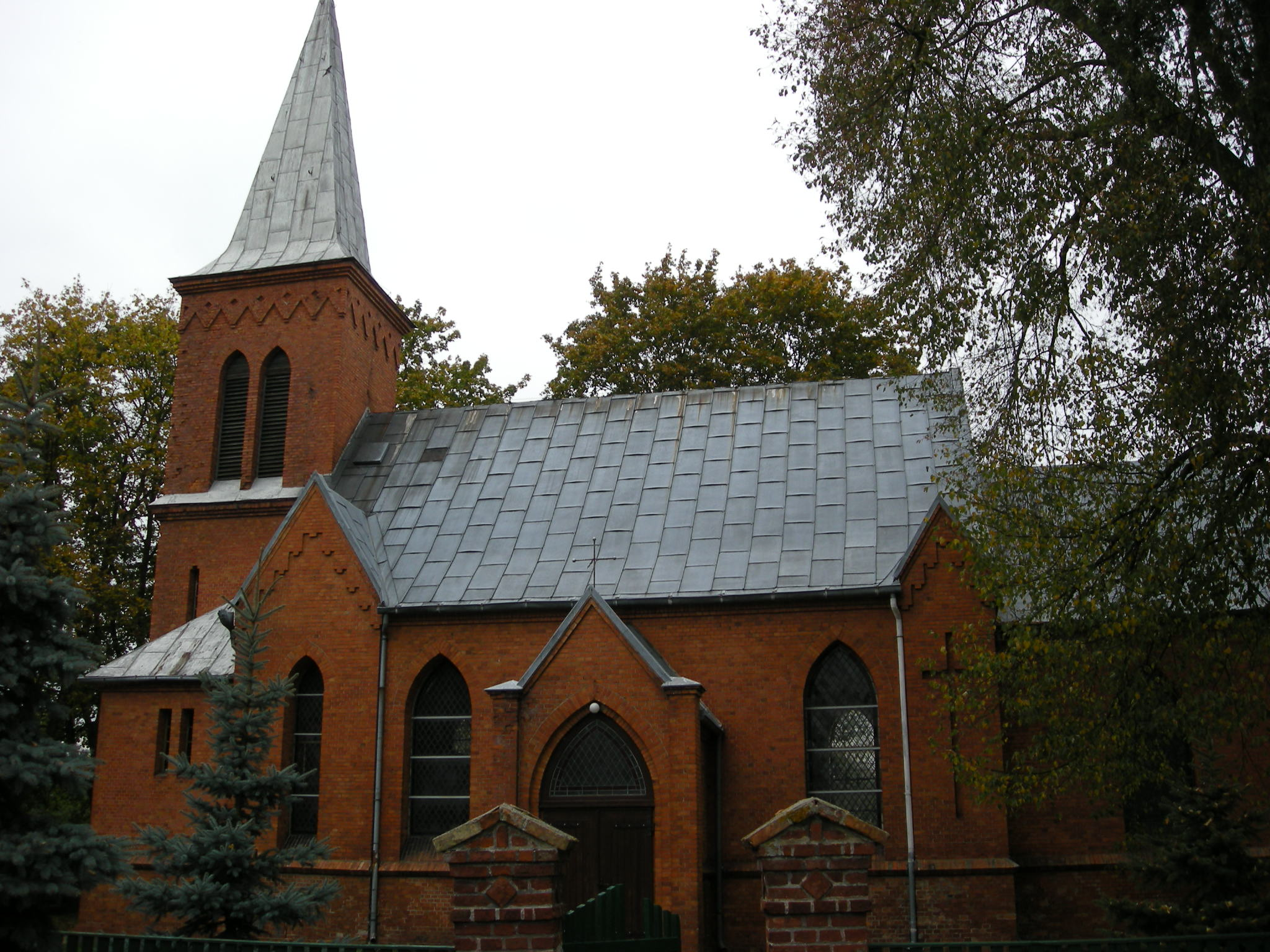
Saint Bartholomew church

The oldest known mention of the village comes from 1337, when it was part of the Piast-ruled Kingdom of Poland. The Saint Bartholomew Catholic parish was established in the 14th century. Samoklęski Duże was a private village of Polish nobility, administratively located in the Kcynia County in the Kalisz Voivodeship in the Greater Poland Province of the Polish Crown.
