= Łachowo =

- Village
- Location within Poland
- Coordinates: 53°01′17″N 17°46′06″E
- Country: Poland
- Voivodeship: Kuyavian-Pomeranian
- County: Nakło
- Gmina: Szubin
- Population: 381

Łachowo [waˈxɔvɔ] is a village in the administrative district of Gmina Szubin, within Nakło County, Kuyavian-Pomeranian Voivodeship, in north-central Poland.
