= Pińsko =

- Village
- Location within Poland
- Coordinates: 53°1′9″N 17°39′54″E
- Country: Poland
- Voivodeship: Kuyavian-Pomeranian
- County: Nakło
- Gmina: Szubin
- Population: 316

Pińsko [ˈpiɲskɔ] is a village in the administrative district of Gmina Szubin, within Nakło County, Kuyavian-Pomeranian Voivodeship, in north-central Poland.
