= Niedźwiady, Nakło County =

Niedźwiady
- Village
- Location within Poland
- Coordinates: 53°4′N 17°41′E
- Country: Poland
- Voivodeship: Kuyavian-Pomeranian
- County: Nakło
- Gmina: Szubin
- Population: 87

Niedźwiady [ɲɛd͡ʑˈvjadɨ] is a village in the administrative district of Gmina Szubin, within Nakło County, Kuyavian-Pomeranian Voivodeship, in north-central Poland.
