= Zielonowo =

Zielonowo may refer to:

- Zielonowo, Greater Poland Voivodeship (west-central Poland)
- Zielonowo, Kuyavian-Pomeranian Voivodeship (north-central Poland)
- Zielonowo, Warmian-Masurian Voivodeship (north Poland)
- Zielonowo, West Pomeranian Voivodeship (north-west Poland)
