= Koraczewko =

- Village
- Location within Poland
- Coordinates: 52°55′50″N 17°38′41″E
- Country: Poland
- Voivodeship: Kuyavian-Pomeranian
- County: Nakło
- Gmina: Szubin
- Population: 13

Koraczewko [kɔraˈt͡ʂɛfkɔ] is a village in the administrative district of Gmina Szubin, within Nakło County, Kuyavian-Pomeranian Voivodeship, in north-central Poland.
