= Skórzewo =

Skórzewo may refer to the following places:

- Skórzewo, Greater Poland Voivodeship, a village adjoining the Grunwald district of Poznań
- Skórzewo, Kuyavian-Pomeranian Voivodeship (north-central Poland)
- Skórzewo, Pomeranian Voivodeship (north Poland)
