= Nadjezierze, Nakło County =

Nadjezierze
- Village
- Location within Poland
- Coordinates: 53°02′03″N 17°51′20″E
- Country: Poland
- Voivodeship: Kuyavian-Pomeranian
- County: Nakło
- Gmina: Szubin

Nadjezierze [nadjɛˈʑɛʐɛ] is a village in the administrative district of Gmina Szubin, within Nakło County, Kuyavian-Pomeranian Voivodeship, in north-central Poland.
