= Wolwark =

- Village
- Location within Poland
- Coordinates: 52°59′N 17°42′E
- Country: Poland
- Voivodeship: Kuyavian-Pomeranian
- County: Nakło
- Gmina: Szubin
- Population: 289
- Website: http://www.wolwark.republika.pl

Wolwark [ˈvɔlvark] is a City in the administrative district of Gmina Wolwark, within Nakło County, Kuyavian-Pomeranian Voivodeship, in north-central Poland.
