= Chraplewo =

Chraplewo may refer to the following places:

- Chraplewo, Nowy Tomyśl County in Greater Poland Voivodeship (west-central Poland)
- Chraplewo, Szamotuły County in Greater Poland Voivodeship (west-central Poland)
- Chraplewo, Kuyavian-Pomeranian Voivodeship (north-central Poland)
