= Godzimierz =

Godzimierz may refer to the following places:

- Godzimierz, Kuyavian-Pomeranian Voivodeship (north-central Poland)
- Godzimierz, Masovian Voivodeship (east-central Poland)
- Godzimierz, West Pomeranian Voivodeship (north-west Poland)
