= Stary Jarużyn =

- Village
- Location within Poland
- Coordinates: 53°04′44″N 17°39′31″E
- Country: Poland
- Voivodeship: Kuyavian-Pomeranian
- County: Nakło
- Gmina: Szubin

Population
  - Total: 235

Stary Jarużyn [ˈstarɨ jaˈruʐɨn] is a village in the administrative district of Gmina Szubin, within Nakło County, Kuyavian-Pomeranian Voivodeship, in north-central Poland.
