= Olek =

Olek may refer to:

- Olek, Nakło County, a village in Poland
- Olek (artist), Polish-born artist

== People with the name ==
- Alfred Olek, Polish footballer
- Olek Czyż, Polish basketball player
- Olek Krupa or Aleksander Krupa, Polish actor often credited as Olek Krupa
