= Wąsosz, Kuyavian-Pomeranian Voivodeship =

Wąsosz
- Village
- Location within Poland
- Coordinates: 52°56′42″N 17°43′58″E
- Country: Poland
- Voivodeship: Kuyavian-Pomeranian
- County: Nakło
- Gmina: Szubin

Population
  - Total: 304
- Postal code: 89-200

Wąsosz [ˈvɔ̃sɔʂ] is a village in the administrative district of Gmina Szubin, within Nakło County, Kuyavian-Pomeranian Voivodeship, in central Poland.
