= Wojsławiec =

Wojsławiec may refer to the following places in Poland:

- Wojsławiec, Kuyavian-Pomeranian Voivodeship
- Wojsławiec, West Pomeranian Voivodeship
