= Szkocja, Kuyavian-Pomeranian Voivodeship =

Szkocja
- Village
- Location within Poland
- Coordinates: 53°03′14″N 17°46′50″E
- Country: Poland
- Voivodeship: Kuyavian-Pomeranian
- County: Nakło
- Gmina: Szubin
- Population: 206

Szkocja [ˈʂkɔt͡sja] is a village in the administrative district of Gmina Szubin, within Nakło County, Kuyavian-Pomeranian Voivodeship, in north-central Poland. Its name is also the Polish word for "Scotland".
