= Godzimierz, Kuyavian-Pomeranian Voivodeship =

Godzimierz
- Village
- Location within Poland
- Coordinates: 53°4′N 17°43′E
- Country: Poland
- Voivodeship: Kuyavian-Pomeranian
- County: Nakło
- Gmina: Szubin
- Population: 112

Godzimierz [ɡɔˈd͡ʑimjɛʂ] is a village in the administrative district of Gmina Szubin, within Nakło County, Kuyavian-Pomeranian Voivodeship, in north-central Poland.

It was formerly part of the Prussian Province of Posen, part of the Kreis Schubin.
