= Kołaczkowo, Kuyavian-Pomeranian Voivodeship =

Kołaczkowo
- Village
- Location within Poland
- Coordinates: 53°1′50″N 17°47′21″E
- Country: Poland
- Voivodeship: Kuyavian-Pomeranian
- County: Nakło
- Gmina: Szubin
- Population: 1,006

Kołaczkowo [kɔwat͡ʂˈkɔvɔ] is a village in the administrative district of Gmina Szubin, within Nakło County, Kuyavian-Pomeranian Voivodeship, in north-central Poland.
