= Podlaski, Kuyavian-Pomeranian Voivodeship =

Podlaski
- Village
- Location within Poland
- Coordinates: 53°5′43″N 17°48′8″E
- Country: Poland
- Voivodeship: Kuyavian-Pomeranian
- County: Nakło
- Gmina: Szubin
- Population: 7

Podlaski [pɔdˈlaski] is a village in the administrative district of Gmina Szubin, within Nakło County, Kuyavian-Pomeranian Voivodeship, in north-central Poland.
