= Zazdrość, Nakło County =

Zazdrość
- Village
- Location within Poland
- Coordinates: 53°2′N 17°48′E
- Country: Poland
- Voivodeship: Kuyavian-Pomeranian
- County: Nakło
- Gmina: Szubin
- Population: 39

Zazdrość [ˈzazdrɔɕt͡ɕ] is a village in the administrative district of Gmina Szubin, within Nakło County, Kuyavian-Pomeranian Voivodeship, in north-central Poland.
