= Wojsławiec, Kuyavian-Pomeranian Voivodeship =

Wojsławiec
- Village
- Location within Poland
- Coordinates: 53°2′55″N 17°49′6″E
- Country: Poland
- Voivodeship: Kuyavian-Pomeranian
- County: Nakło
- Gmina: Szubin
- Population: 62

Wojsławiec [vɔi̯ˈswavjɛt͡s] is a village in the administrative district of Gmina Szubin, within Nakło County, Kuyavian-Pomeranian Voivodeship, in north-central Poland.
