= Zalesie, Nakło County =

Zalesie
- Village
- Location within Poland
- Coordinates: 52°59′26″N 17°35′56″E
- Country: Poland
- Voivodeship: Kuyavian-Pomeranian
- County: Nakło
- Gmina: Szubin
- Population: 753

Zalesie [zaˈlɛɕɛ] is a village in the administrative district of Gmina Szubin, within Nakło County, Kuyavian-Pomeranian Voivodeship, in north-central Poland.
