= Olek, Nakło County =

Olek
- Village
- Location within Poland
- Coordinates: 53°5′30″N 17°46′26″E
- Country: Poland
- Voivodeship: Kuyavian-Pomeranian
- County: Nakło
- Gmina: Szubin
- Population: 53

Olek [ˈɔlɛk] is a village in the administrative district of Gmina Szubin, within Nakło County, Kuyavian-Pomeranian Voivodeship, in north-central Poland.
