= Szubin-Wieś =

- Village
- Location within Poland
- Coordinates: 53°01′31″N 17°43′47″E
- Country: Poland
- Voivodeship: Kuyavian-Pomeranian
- County: Nakło
- Gmina: Szubin
- Population: 324

Szubin-Wieś [ˈʂubin ˈvjɛɕ] is a village in the administrative district of Gmina Szubin, within Nakło County, Kuyavian-Pomeranian Voivodeship, in north-central Poland.

== Demography ==
According to Polish National Census (2011) in 2011, Szubin-Wieś had 361 inhabitants. It is the 12th largest town in the Szubin borough.
