= Skórzewo, Kuyavian-Pomeranian Voivodeship =

Skórzewo
- Village
- Location within Poland
- Coordinates: 53°3′N 17°49′E
- Country: Poland
- Voivodeship: Kuyavian-Pomeranian
- County: Nakło
- Gmina: Szubin
- Population: 65

Skórzewo [skuˈʐɛvɔ] is a village in the administrative district of Gmina Szubin, within Nakło County, Kuyavian-Pomeranian Voivodeship, in north-central Poland.
