= Gąbin, Kuyavian-Pomeranian Voivodeship =

Gąbin
- Village
- Location within Poland
- Coordinates: 52°56′43″N 17°46′43″E
- Country: Poland
- Voivodeship: Kuyavian-Pomeranian
- County: Nakło
- Gmina: Szubin
- Population: 248

Gąbin [ˈɡɔmbin] is a village in the administrative district of Gmina Szubin, within Nakło County, Kuyavian-Pomeranian Voivodeship, in north-central Poland.
