= Chomętowo, Kuyavian-Pomeranian Voivodeship =

Chomętowo
- Village
- Location within Poland
- Coordinates: 52°56′N 17°46′E
- Country: Poland
- Voivodeship: Kuyavian-Pomeranian
- County: Nakło
- Gmina: Szubin
- Highest elevation: 120 m (390 ft)
- Lowest elevation: 95 m (312 ft)
- Population: 270

Chomętowo [xɔmɛnˈtɔvɔ] is a village in the administrative district of Gmina Szubin, within Nakło County, Kuyavian-Pomeranian Voivodeship, in north-central Poland.
