= Ryszard Musielak =

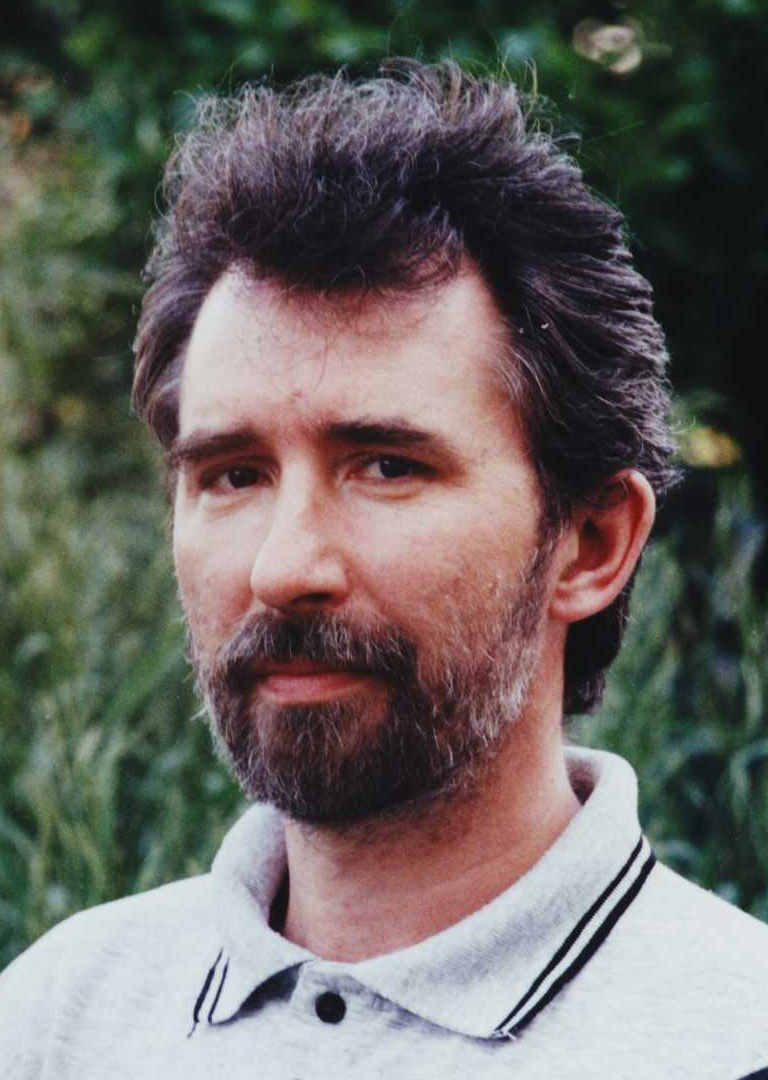
Ryszard Musielak

Ryszard Józef Musielak (born 6 September 1950, Szubin, Poland) is one of the former leaders of the Polish Solidarity union in Toruń and currently one of the leaders of the local branch of Committee for the Defence of Democracy.

He led the strike and the emerging trade union structures in the "Toral" factory in Toruń. Later on he was elected to a member of Toruń's Solidarity union management. During the martial law Musielak was arrested and he spent a year in prisons in Potulice and Strzebielinek.

After leaving jail in December 1982, he continued his activities for the Polish anti-communist opposition. As one of his tasks, he was responsible for a periodic magazine TIS, printed illegally by the union in Toruń.

After the breakthrough in 1989 he was elected a president of Solidarity District Toruń, leading the organization for 2 years (1989–1991).

== Personal life ==
He has a wife Irena and a son, Borys (from a previous marriage).

On 12 December 2009, Musielak was awarded the Commander's Cross of the Order of Polonia Restituta by President Lech Kaczynski.

== See also ==
- Solidarity (Polish trade union)
- History of Poland
- Toruń
