= Skórzewski =

Skórzewski is a surname. Notable people with the surname include:

- Edward Skórzewski (1930–1991), Polish film director and screenwriter
- Jerzy Potulicki-Skórzewski (1894–1950), Polish bobsledder
- Paweł Skórzewski (1744–1819), Polish Brigadier General
