= Gabin (surname) =

Gabin is a French surname. Notable people with the surname include:

- George Gabin (1931–2012), American painter and art educator
- Jean Gabin (1904–1976), French actor and singer
- Mata Gabin (born 1972), French actress and author

== See also ==
- Gavin
