= Tur, Kuyavian-Pomeranian Voivodeship =

Tur
- Village
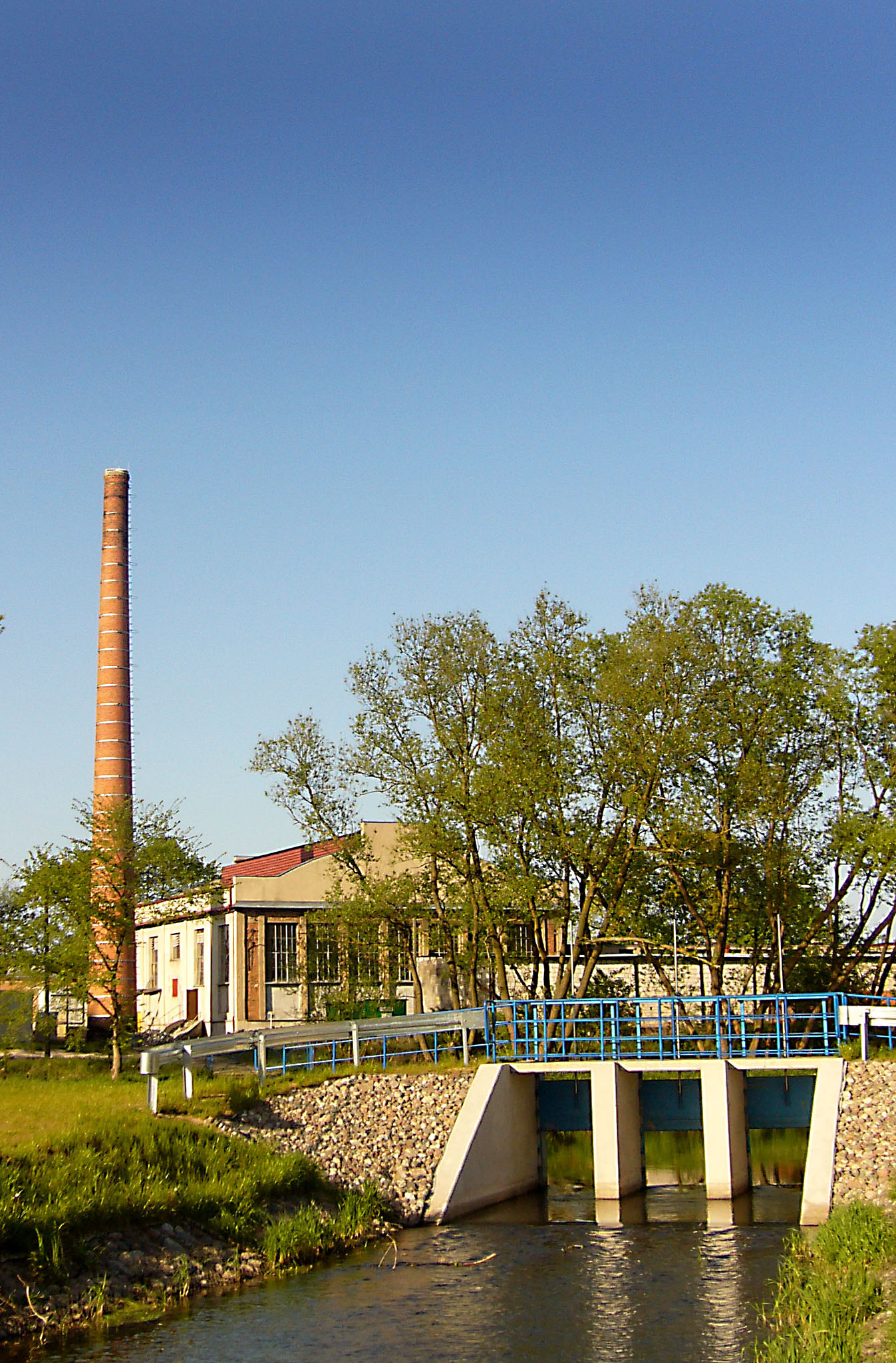
- Glassworks in Tur

- Location within Poland
- Coordinates: 53°5′N 17°44′E
- Country: Poland
- Voivodeship: Kuyavian-Pomeranian
- County: Nakło
- Gmina: Szubin
- First mentioned: 1337

Population
  - Total: 1,040
- Time zone: UTC+1 (CET)
  - Summer (DST): UTC+2 (CEST)
- Vehicle registration: CNA

Tur [tur] is a village in the administrative district of Gmina Szubin, within Nakło County, Kuyavian-Pomeranian Voivodeship, in north-central Poland. It is situated on the Noteć river.

== History ==
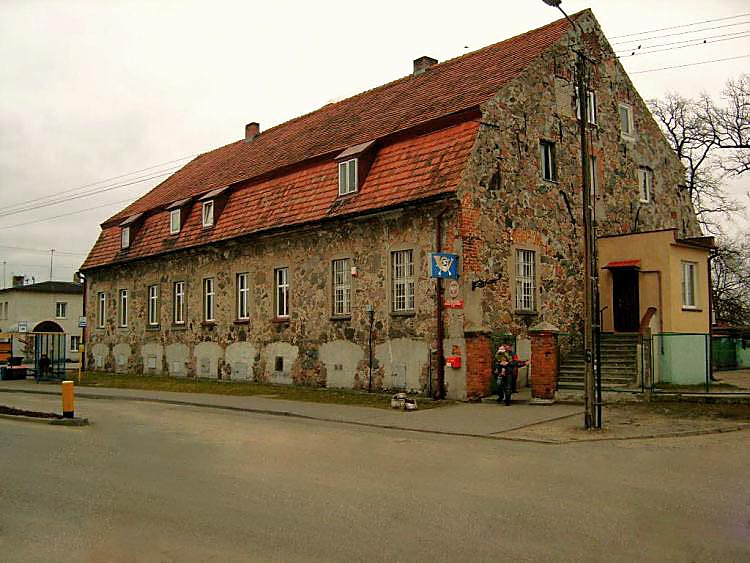
Post office, military headquarters of the Stalag XXI-B POW camp under German occupation

The oldest known mention of the village comes from 1337, when it was part of the Piast-ruled Kingdom of Poland. Tur was a private village of Polish nobility, administratively located in the Kcynia County in the Kalisz Voivodeship in the Greater Poland Province.

During the German occupation of Poland (World War II), in 1940, the Germans expelled several Polish families from the village. Poles were mostly deported to the Kraków District of the General Government in the more eastern part of German-occupied Poland, while their houses and farms were handed over to German colonists as part of the Lebensraum policy. In December 1940, the Germans relocated the Stalag XXI-B prisoner-of-war camp for Allied (mostly British) POWs from Szubin to Tur. In October 1941, the camp was dissolved and the POWs were relocated to the Stalag XXI-D in Poznań and its forced labour subcamps.
