= Kopaszyna coat of arms =

Polish coat of arms

Kopaszyna
- Alternative names: Czeluść, Kopasina, Poruba, Zawotuł
- Towns: none
- Families: 15 families altogether: Barczkowski, Budek, Budkowski, Cząstecki, Kidałowski, Kopaliński, Kopasiński, Kopaszyna, Międzygórski, Sikorski, Slanka, Słąnka, Zaborski, Zdrohecki, Słąka

Kopaszyna is a Polish coat of arms. It was used by several szlachta families in the times of the Polish–Lithuanian Commonwealth.

== Notable bearers ==
Notable bearers of this coat of arms include:

- Władysław Sikorski - (May 20, 1881 Tuszów Narodowy — July 4, 1943 Gibraltar) Polish military and political leader, General of army.

== See also ==
- Polish heraldry
- Heraldry
- Coat of arms
