= Gmina Szubin =

Gmina Szubin Szubin Commune
- Gmina
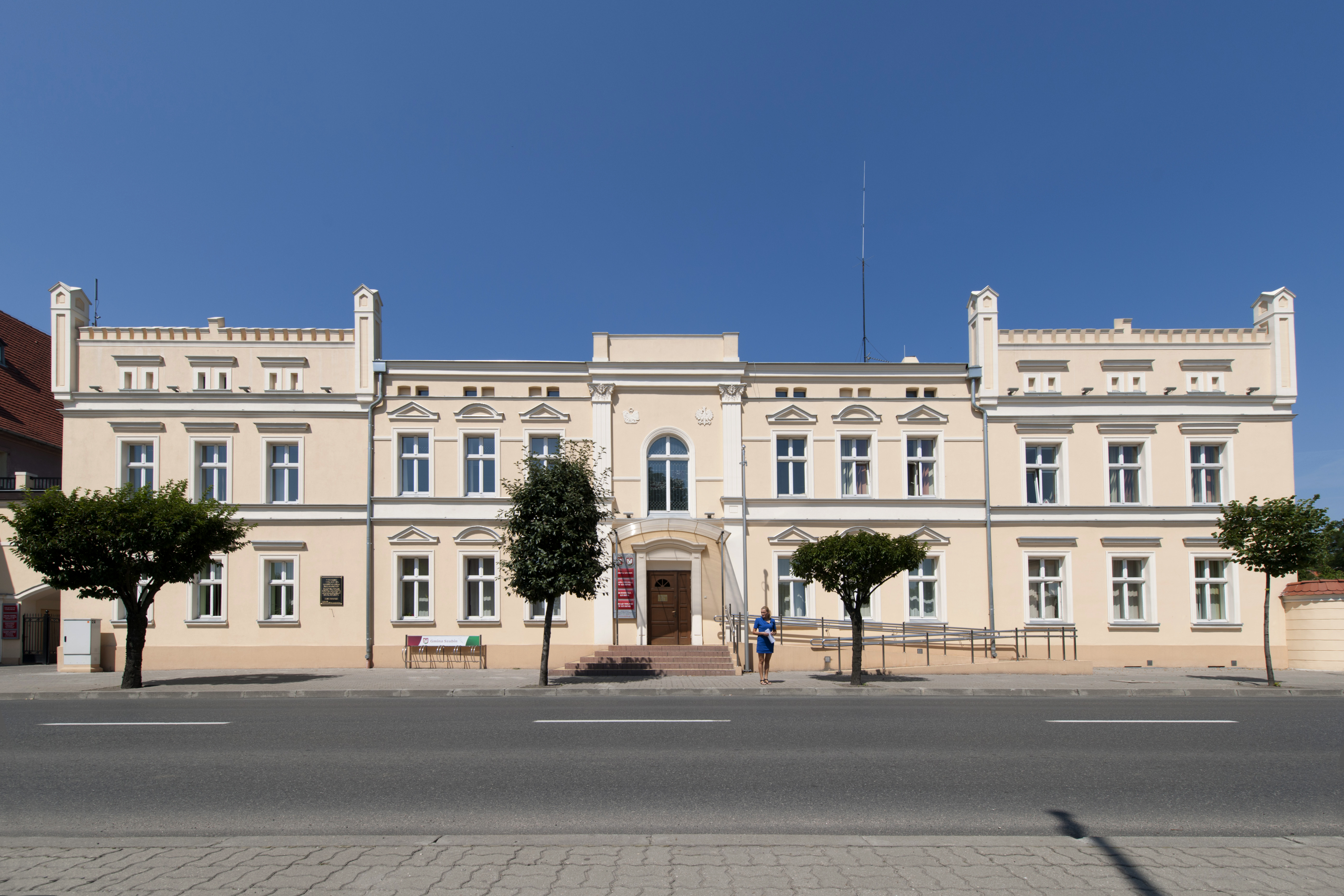
- Town Hall in Szubin, seat of the gmina office

- Coat of arms
- Interactive map of Gmina Szubin
- Coordinates (Szubin): 53°1′N 17°45′E
- Country: Poland
- Voivodeship: Kuyavian-Pomeranian
- County: Nakło
- Seat: Szubin

Area
  - Total: 332.09 km^{2} (128.22 sq mi)

Population (2019)
  - Total: 24,756
  - Density: 74.546/km^{2} (193.07/sq mi)
  - Urban: 9,556
  - Rural: 15,200
- Time zone: UTC+1 (CET)
  - Summer (DST): UTC+2 (CEST)
- Vehicle registration: CNA

Gmina Szubin is an urban-rural gmina (administrative district) in Nakło County, Kuyavian-Pomeranian Voivodeship, in north-central Poland. Its seat is the town of Szubin, which lies approximately 18 kilometres (11 mi) south-east of Nakło nad Notecią and 21 km (13 mi) south-west of Bydgoszcz.

The gmina covers an area of 332.09 square kilometres (128.2 sq mi), and as of 2019 its total population is 24,756 (out of which the population of Szubin amounts to 9,556, and the population of the rural part of the gmina is 15,200).

== Villages ==
Apart from the town of Szubin, Gmina Szubin contains the villages and settlements of Ameryczka, Bielawy, Brzózki, Chobielin, Chomętowo, Chraplewo, Ciężkowo, Dąbrówka Słupska, Drogosław, Gąbin, Głęboczek, Godzimierz, Grzeczna Panna, Jeziorowo, Kołaczkowo, Koraczewko, Kornelin, Kowalewo, Królikowo, Łachowo, Mąkoszyn, Małe Rudy, Nadjezierze, Nadkanale, Niedźwiady, Olek, Pińsko, Podlaski, Retkowo, Rynarzewo, Rzemieniewice, Samoklęski Duże, Samoklęski Małe, Skórzewo, Słonawy, Słupy, Smarzykowo, Smolniki, Stanisławka, Stary Jarużyn, Suchy Pies, Szaradowo, Szkocja, Szubin-Wieś, Trzciniec, Tur, Wąsosz, Wojsławiec, Wolwark, Wrzosy, Wymysłowo, Zalesie, Zamość, Zazdrość, Żędowo, Zielonowo and Żurczyn.

== Neighbouring gminas ==
Gmina Szubin is bordered by the gminas of Białe Błota, Kcynia, Łabiszyn, Nakło nad Notecią and Żnin.
