= Jean-Gabin Moubeke =

Ivorian footballer

Personal information
- Date of birth: 3 March 1982 (age 44)
- Place of birth: Abidjan, Ivory Coast
- Height: 1.69 m (5 ft 7 in)
- Position: Forward

Youth career
- 1998–2000: Nice

Senior career*
Years	Team	Apps	(Gls)
–2004	Nice II		
2000–2004	Nice	1	(0)
2004–2005	Brentford	0	(0)
2005–2014	US Cagnes		
- * Club domestic league appearances and goals

Jean-Gabin Moubeke (born 3 March 1982) is an Ivorian former professional footballer who played as a forward for Nice and US Cagnes.

== Career statistics ==
Appearances and goals by club, season and competition
Club	Season	League			National cup		League cup		Total	
Club	Season	Division	Apps	Goals	Apps	Goals	Apps	Goals	Apps	Goals
Nice	2000–01	Division 2	1	0	0	0	0	0	1	0
Career total			1	0	0	0	0	0	1	0
