= Szubin =

Town in Kuyavian-Pomeranian Voivodeship, Poland

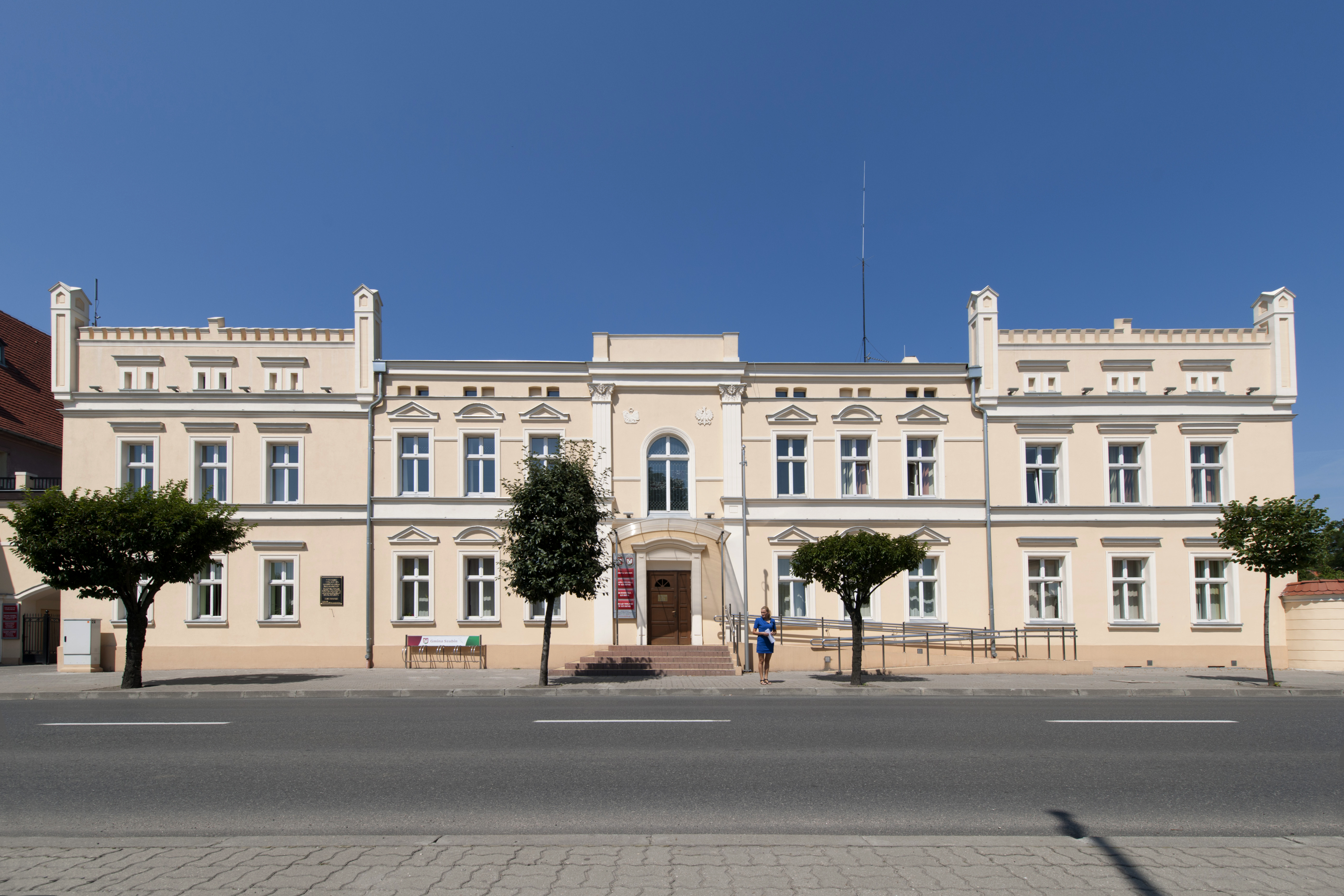
- Town Hall

- Flag Coat of arms

- Location within Poland
- Coordinates: 53°1′N 17°45′E
- Country: Poland
- Voivodeship: Kuyavian-Pomeranian
- County: Nakło
- Gmina: Szubin
- First mentioned: 1365

Area
  - Total: 7.65 km^{2} (2.95 sq mi)

Population (2010)
  - Total: 9,333
  - Density: 1,220/km^{2} (3,160/sq mi)
- Time zone: UTC+1 (CET)
  - Summer (DST): UTC+2 (CEST)
- Postal code: 89-200
- Vehicle registration: CNA
- Website: http://www.szubin.pl

Szubin ([ˈʂubin]) is a town in Nakło County, Kuyavian-Pomeranian Voivodeship, Poland, located southwest of Bydgoszcz. It has a population of around 9,333 (as of 2010). It is located on the Gąsawka River in the ethnocultural region of Pałuki.

A small town in the Pałuki subregion of historical Greater Poland, founded in the Middle Ages, it became more known for being the site of German-operated prisoner-of-war camps for Allied soldiers and officers of various nationalities during the German occupation of Poland in World War II, chiefly Polish, French, British and American.

== History ==
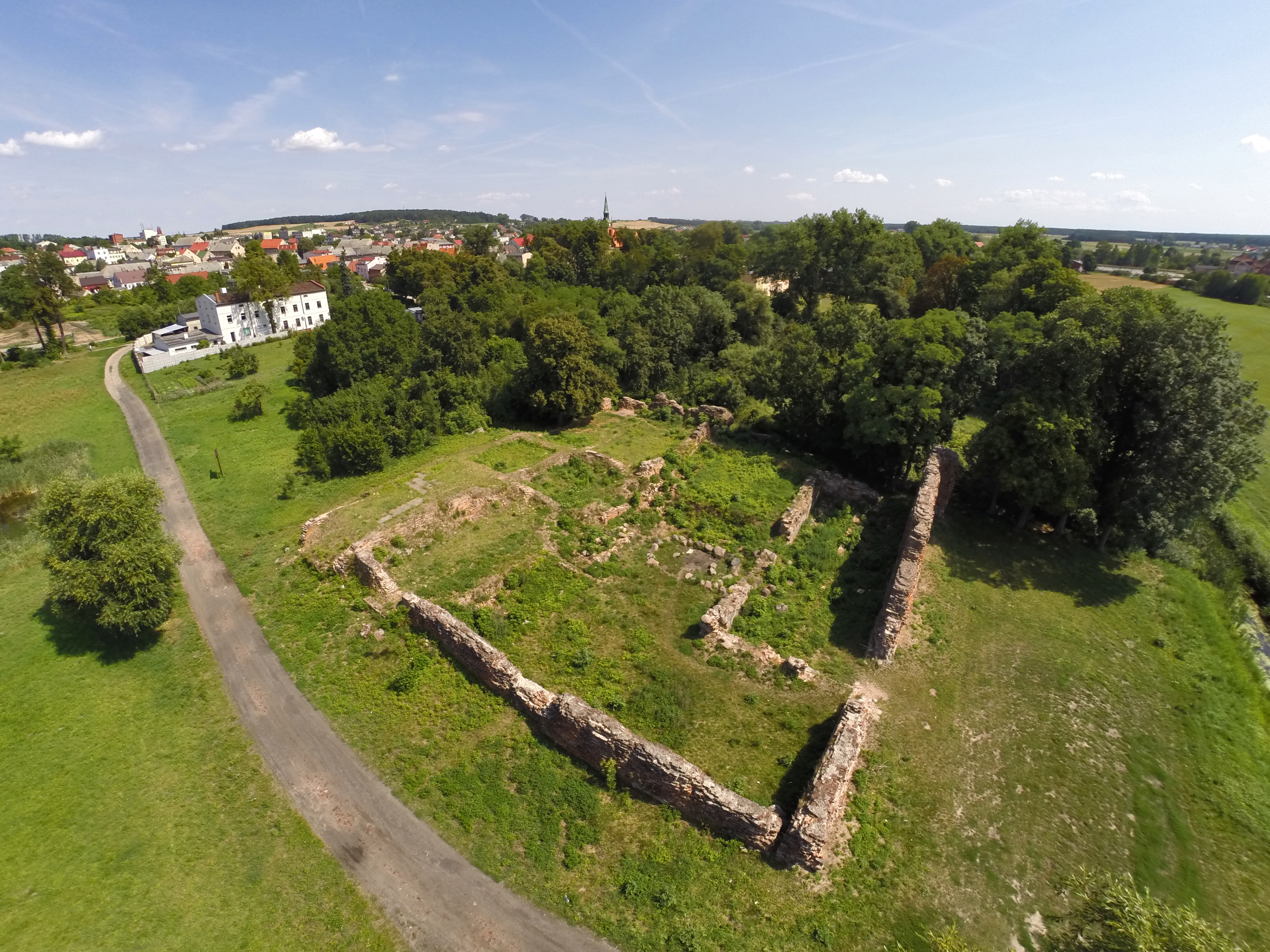
Remains of the old castle

The first record of a settlement next to the castle of the Pałuka family was noted in 1365. It became a town in 1434. Szubin was a private town of Polish nobility, including the Mycielski and Opaliński families, administratively located in the Kcynia County in the Kalisz Voivodeship in the Greater Poland Province of the Kingdom of Poland. It was granted new privileges in 1645 and 1750.

In 1773, it was annexed by Prussia during the Partitions of Poland. In 1783, the town had a population of 1,170, of which 936 (80%) were Poles, 154 (13%) were Germans and 80 (7%) were Jews. After the successful Greater Poland uprising of 1806, it was regained by the Poles and included in the short-lived Polish Duchy of Warsaw, administratively located within its Bydgoszcz Department. After the duchy's dissolution it was re-annexed by Prussia in 1815 and from 1871 to 1919, it was also part of Germany and was known in German as Schubin. Administratively, Schubin was the capital of the Schubin district in the Bromberg region of the Prussian Province of Posen. Local people took part in the various insurrections which unsuccessfully tried to regain freedom in the 19th century. To resist Germanisation policies, Poles also founded various organizations.

After World War I, in 1918, Poland regained independence, and the Greater Poland Uprising broke out, whose goal was to reintegrate the region with the reborn Polish state. On January 3, 1919 the town was recaptured by the German Grenzschutz, and afterwards Germany concentrated significant forces in the town, and carried out mass arrests of local Poles, who were then deported to Bydgoszcz (Bromberg), Szczecin (Stettin) and Goleniów (Gollnow). On January 8, 1919, Polish insurgents unsuccessfully attempted to recapture the town, however the next battle of Szubin on January 11–12 ended with Polish victory, and the town finally became part of the Second Polish Republic.

=== World War II ===
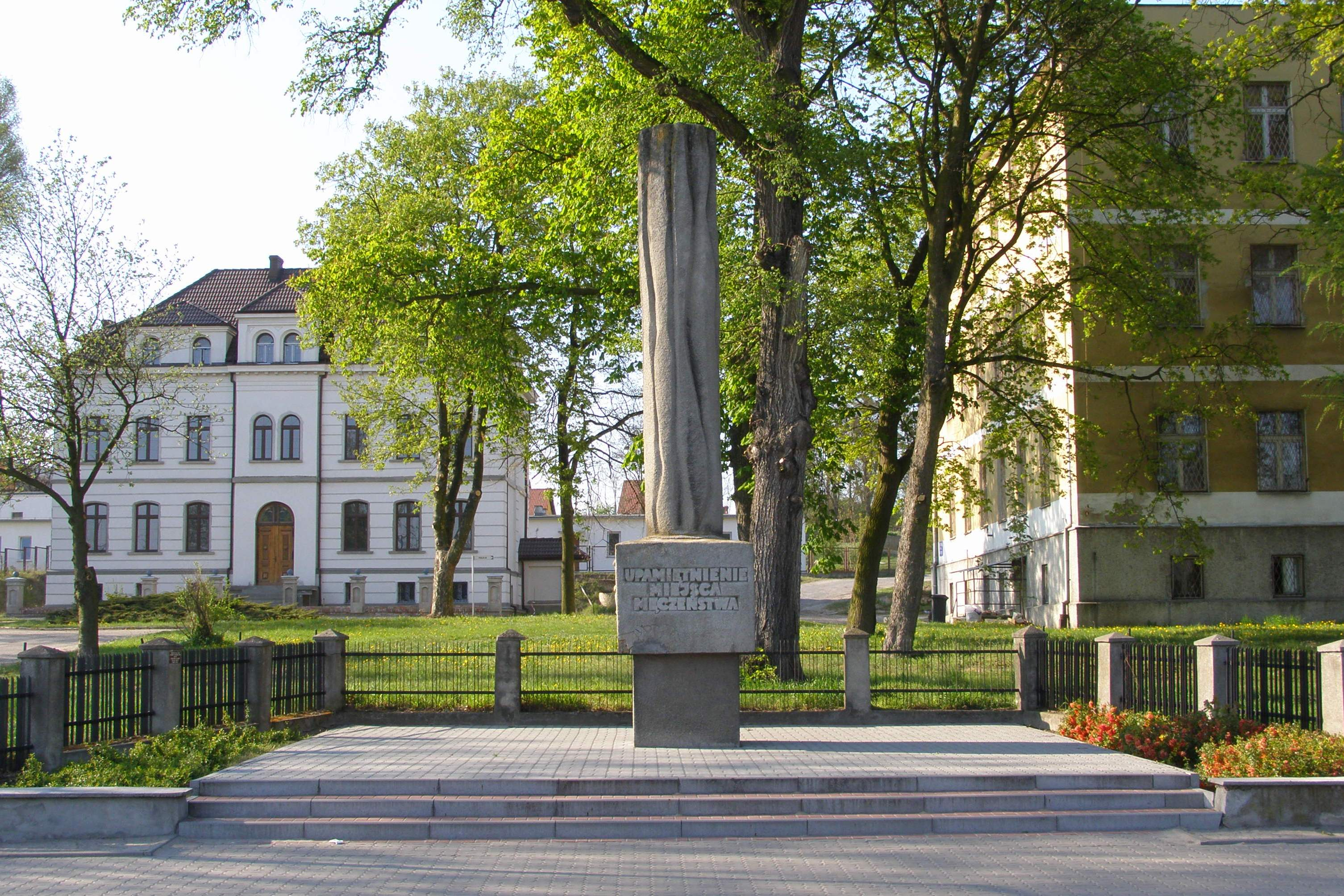
Memorial to the Oflag XXI-B and Oflag 64 prisoners

During the invasion of Poland, which started World War II, in September 1939, the town was quickly occupied by German troops and was directly annexed to Nazi Germany as part of the newly established region named Warthegau. In September and October 1939, the Germans established an internment camp for Polish civilians, mostly intelligentsia arrested during the Intelligenzaktion, and a prisoner-of-war camp for captured Polish soldiers (Stalag XXI-B). Szubin was one of the sites of executions of Poles, carried out by the Germans as part of the Intelligenzaktion. In December 1939 and January 1940, the Germans expelled 1,280 and 780 Poles respectively, including activists, veterans of the Greater Poland Uprising, families of teachers, local officials and owners of shops, workshops and better houses, which were then handed over to German colonists as part of the Lebensraum policy. The Polish resistance movement was active in Szubin, including a local unit of the Wielkopolska Organizacja Wojskowa, later merged into the Wojskowa Organizacja Ziem Zachodnich.

In 1940, the boys' school in the town was surrounded by barbed wire fences and additional concrete huts were added, so that it could become a prisoner-of-war camp for captured Polish, French, British, Canadian, Australian, New Zealand and Soviet officers as Oflag XXI-B, while the Stalag XXI-B POW camp was relocated to the nearby village of Tur. In 1943, the Oflag XXI-B camp was changed to a camp for U.S. Army officers as Oflag 64. Also a Nazi prison was operated in the town. The town reverted to Poland after being liberated by Soviet troops on 21 January 1945.

== Demographics ==
Historical population

Year	Pop.	±%
1890	3,047	—
1900	3,065	+0.6%
1910	3,071	+0.2%
1921	2,744	−10.6%
1931	3,271	+19.2%

Year	Pop.	±%
1939	3,437	+5.1%
1950	3,775	+9.8%
1960	5,437	+44.0%
2010	9,333	+71.7%

== Sports ==
The local football club is Szubinianka Szubin. It competes in the lower leagues.

== Gallery ==
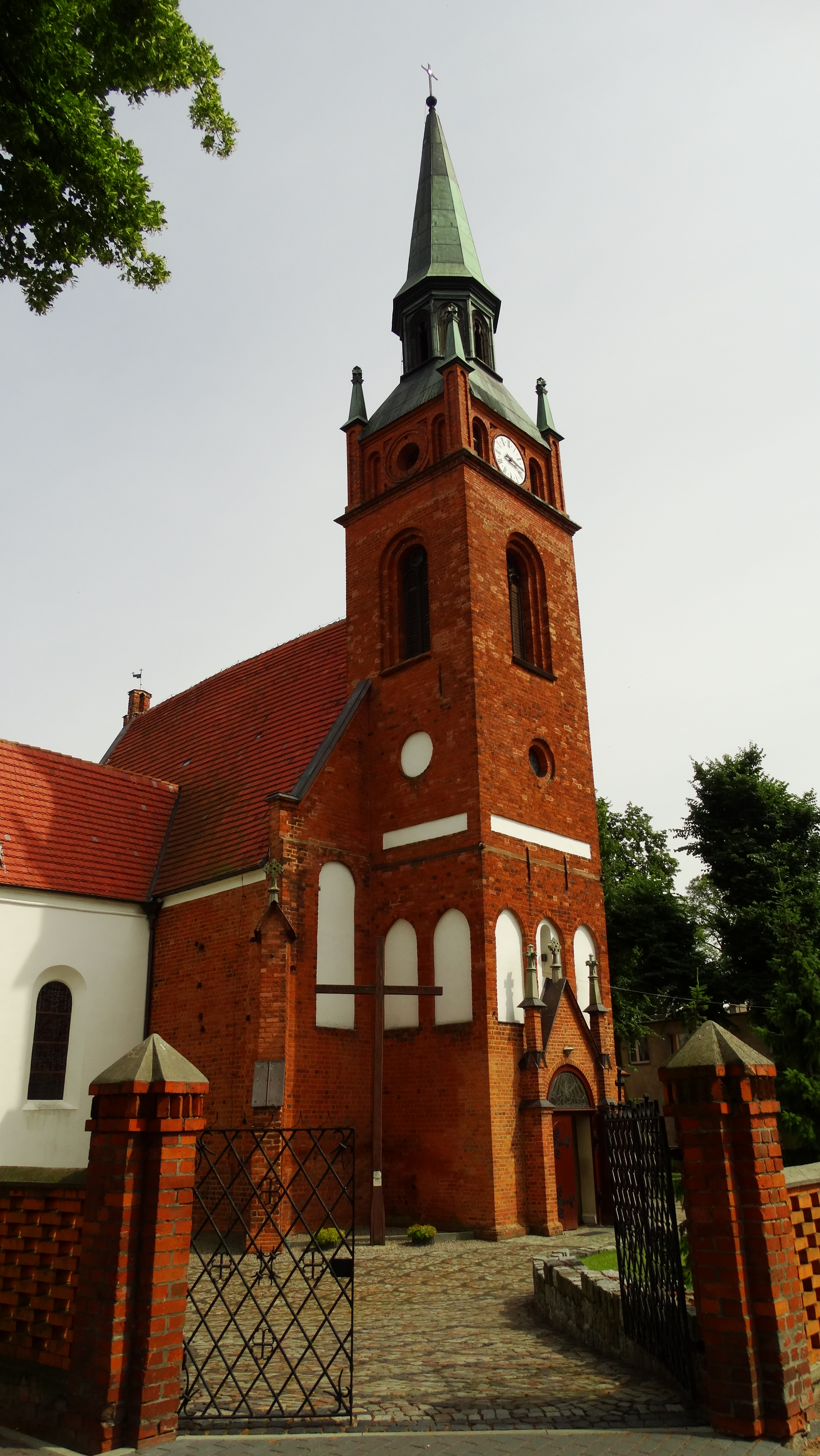
Saint Martin church

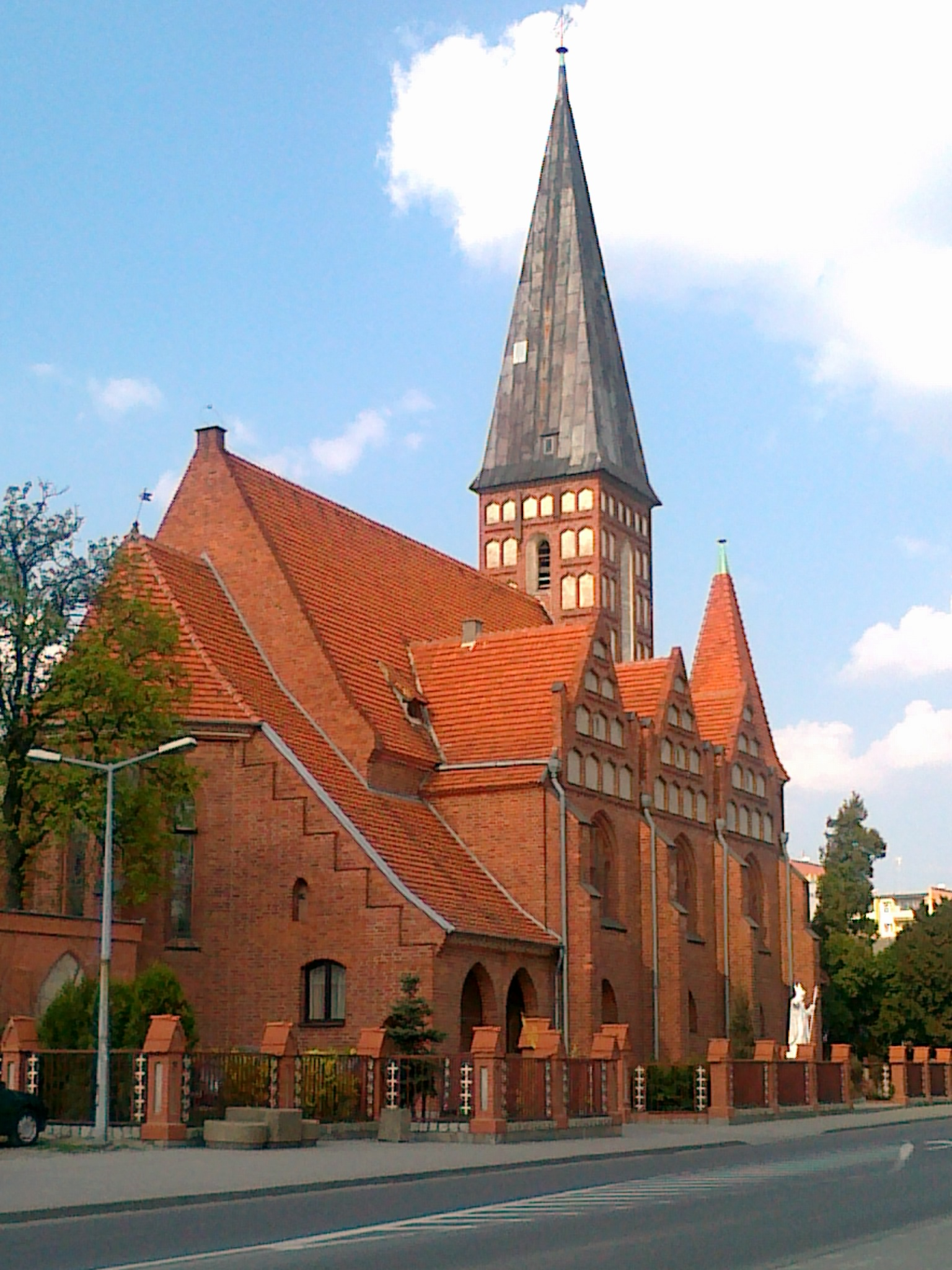
Saint Andrew Bobola church

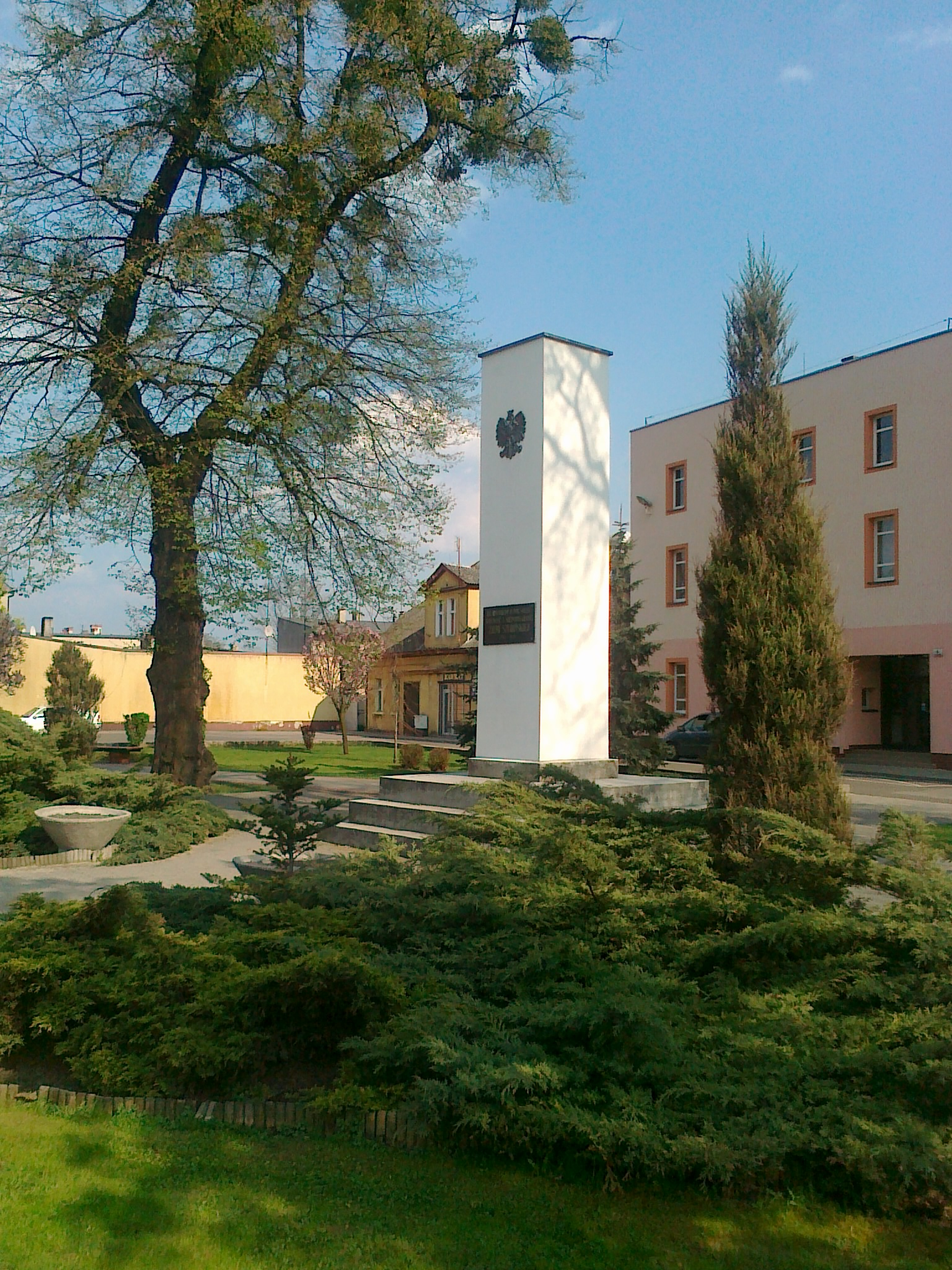
Memorial to the victims of the Nazi German occupation

== Notable residents ==
- Moses Mielziner (1828–1903), rabbi
- Friedrich-Wilhelm von Chappuis (1886–1942), general
- Ryszard Musielak (born 1950), union leader
- Jarosław Godek (born 1981), rower

== See also ==
- Oflag 64
