= Rynarzewo =

- Village
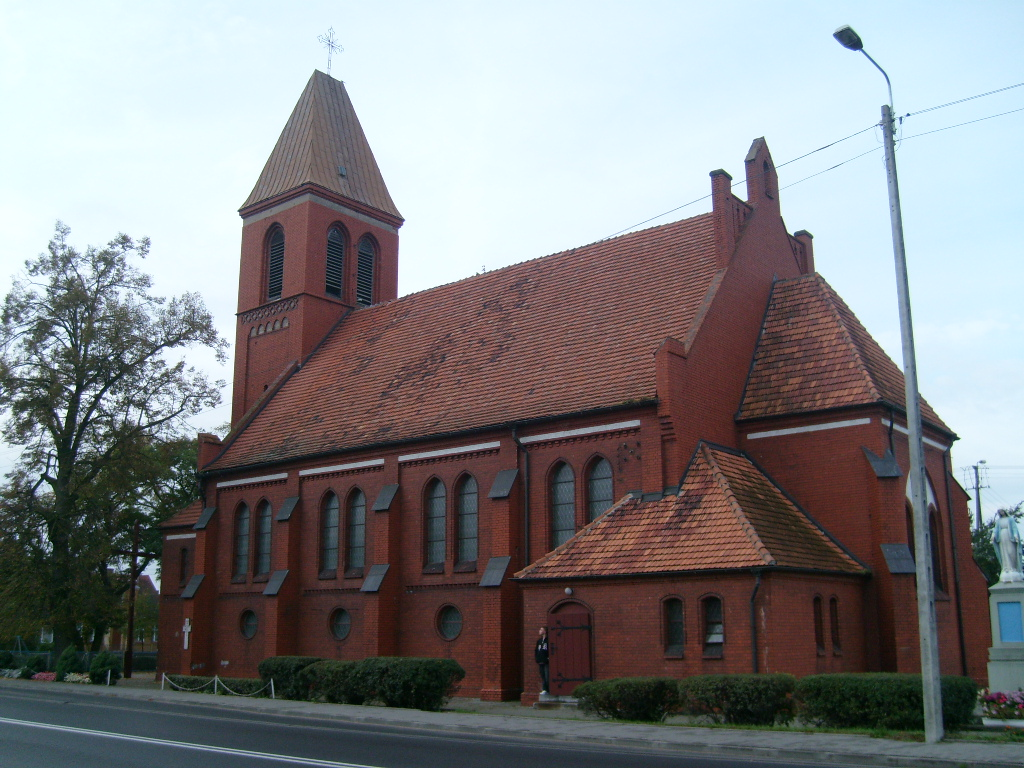
- Church of Saint Stanislaus

- Coat of arms

- Location within Poland
- Coordinates: 53°4′N 17°49′E
- Country: Poland
- Voivodeship: Kuyavian-Pomeranian
- County: Nakło
- Gmina: Szubin

Population
  - Total: 1,155

Rynarzewo [rɨnaˈʐɛvɔ] is a village in the administrative district of Gmina Szubin, within Nakło County, Kuyavian-Pomeranian Voivodeship, in north-central Poland.
