= Nakło County =

Nakło County Powiat nakielski
- County
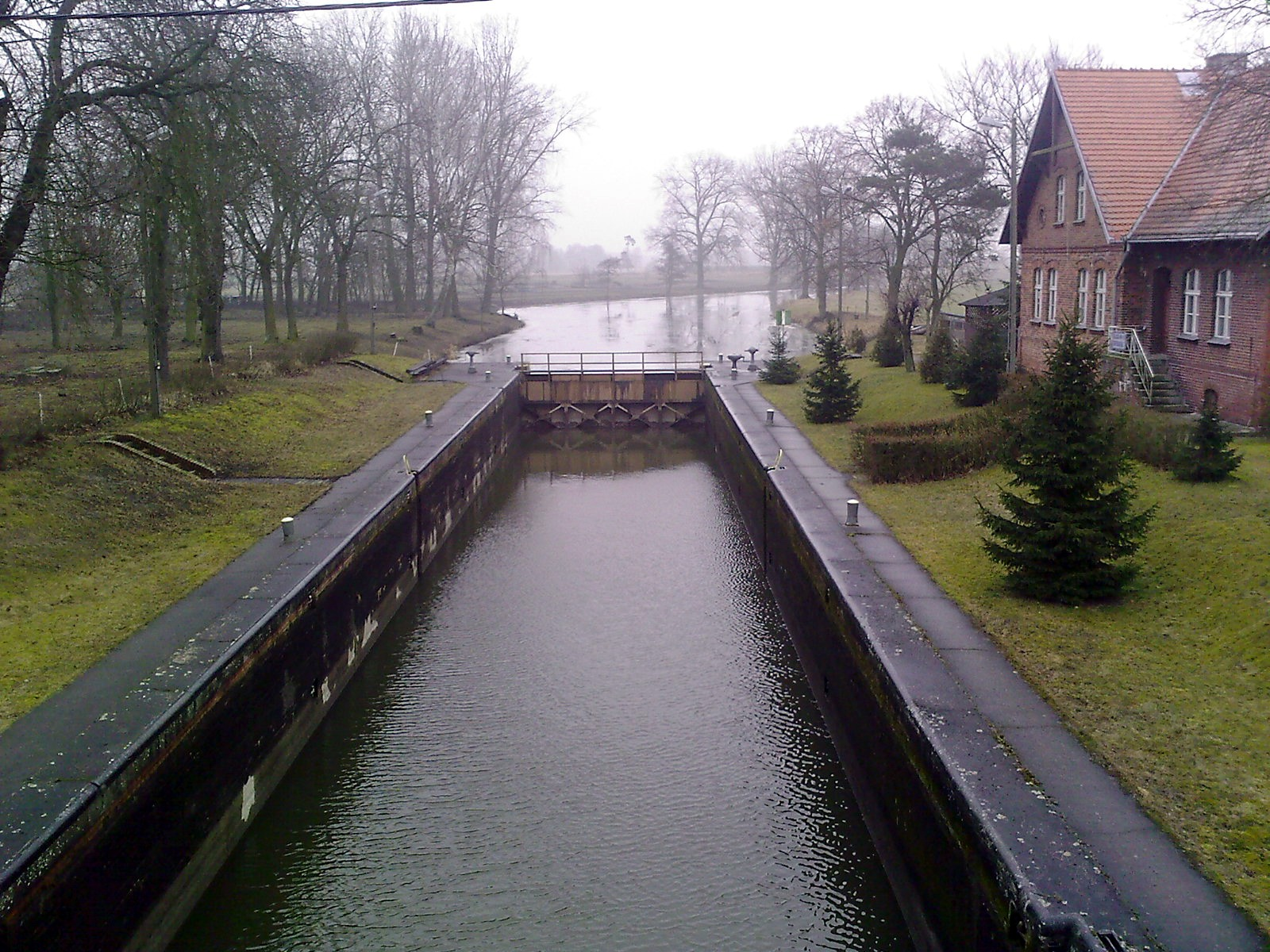

- Flag Coat of arms

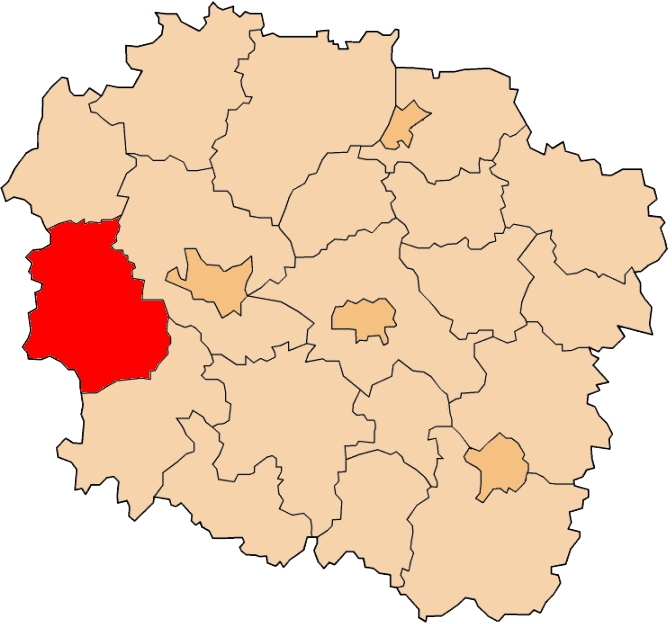
- Location within the voivodeship
- Coordinates (Nakło nad Notecią): 53°8′25″N 17°35′34″E
- Country: Poland
- Voivodeship: Kuyavian-Pomeranian
- Seat: Nakło nad Notecią
- Gminas: Total 5: Gmina Kcynia; Gmina Mrocza; Gmina Nakło nad Notecią; Gmina Sadki; Gmina Szubin

Area
  - Total: 1,120.48 km^{2} (432.62 sq mi)

Population (2006)
  - Total: 86,449
  - Density: 77.154/km^{2} (199.83/sq mi)
  - Urban: 36,844
  - Rural: 49,605
- Car plates: CNA
- Website: www.powiat-nakielski.pl

Nakło County (Polish: powiat nakielski) is a unit of territorial administration and local government (powiat) in Kuyavian-Pomeranian Voivodeship, north-central Poland. It came into being on January 1, 1999, as a result of the Polish local government reforms passed in 1998. Its administrative seat and largest town is Nakło nad Notecią, which lies 28 km (17 mi) west of Bydgoszcz and 70 km (43 mi) west of Toruń. The county contains three other towns: Szubin, lying 18 km (11 mi) south-east of Nakło nad Notecią, Kcynia, lying 18 km (11 mi) south-west of Nakło nad Notecią, and Mrocza, 12 km (7 mi) north of Nakło nad Notecią.

The county covers an area of 1,120.48 square kilometres (432.6 sq mi). As of 2006 its total population is 84,786, out of which the population of Nakło nad Notecią is 18,281, that of Szubin is 9,556, that of Kcynia is 4,657, that of Mrocza is 4,350, and the rural population is 49,605.

== Neighbouring counties ==
Nakło County is bordered by Sępólno County to the north, Bydgoszcz County to the east, Żnin County to the south, Wągrowiec County to the southwest and Piła County to the west.

== Administrative divisions ==
The county is subdivided into five gminas (four urban-rural and one rural). These are listed in the following table, in descending order of population.

Gmina	Type	Area (km^{2})	Population (2019)	Seat
Gmina Nakło nad Notecią	urban-rural	187.0	31,789	Nakło nad Notecią
Gmina Szubin	urban-rural	332.1	24,756	Szubin
Gmina Kcynia	urban-rural	297.0	13,409	Kcynia
Gmina Mrocza	urban-rural	150.7	9,222	Mrocza
Gmina Sadki	rural	153.7	7,273	Sadki
