= Bak =

Bak or BAK may refer to:

== People ==
- Bak (surname), including a list of people with the name
- Bąk (surname), a Polish surname, including a list of people with the name
- Park (Korean surname), sometimes also Pak or Bak
- Bek (sculptor) or Bak, ancient Egyptian sculptor

== Places ==
- Bäk, Lauenburg, Schleswig-Holstein, Germany
- Bak District, Khost, Afghanistan
  - Bäk, Khost Province, Afghanistan
- Bak, Hungary
- Bak, South Khorasan, Iran
- Bąk (disambiguation), including several places in Poland

== Science and technology ==
- Bak file, a filename extension commonly used to signify a backup copy
- Bill and keep, reciprocal payment in telecommunications systems
- Benzalkonium chloride, a cationic surfactant

== Transport ==
- Battersea Park railway station, London, England, station code BAK
- Columbus Municipal Airport (Indiana), U.S., FAA airport code BAK
- BAK, IATA airport code for Baku metropolitan area, Azerbaijan

== Other uses ==
- Bak (instrument), a Korean wooden clapper
- BAK (Austria), federal anti corruption agency
- BAK (magazine), online visual arts magazine
- Bashkir language, ISO 639 language code bak
- × Bakerara, abbreviation Bak., hybrid orchids
- BaK, World War I anti-balloon gun, from the German Ballonabwehrkanone
- Betrayal at Krondor, a video game
- Biking Across Kansas, an annual recreational and social rally
- Kocjan Bąk, a motor glider
- Lieutenant Bak, a character in novels by Lauren Haney

== See also ==
- Bąk (disambiguation)
- Bcl-2 homologous antagonist killer, encoded by the BAK1 gene
