= Turzyn (disambiguation) =

Turzyn is a neighborhood in Szczecin, Poland.

Turzyn may also refer to:

- Turzyn, Kuyavian-Pomeranian Voivodeship (north-central Poland)
- Turzyn, Masovian Voivodeship (east-central Poland)
- Turzyn, Silesian Voivodeship (south Poland)
