= Iwno =

Iwno may refer to the following places in Poland:

- Iwno, Lower Silesian Voivodeship (south-west Poland)
- Iwno, Kuyavian-Pomeranian Voivodeship (north-central Poland)
- Iwno, Greater Poland Voivodeship (west-central Poland)
