= Szczepice =

- Village
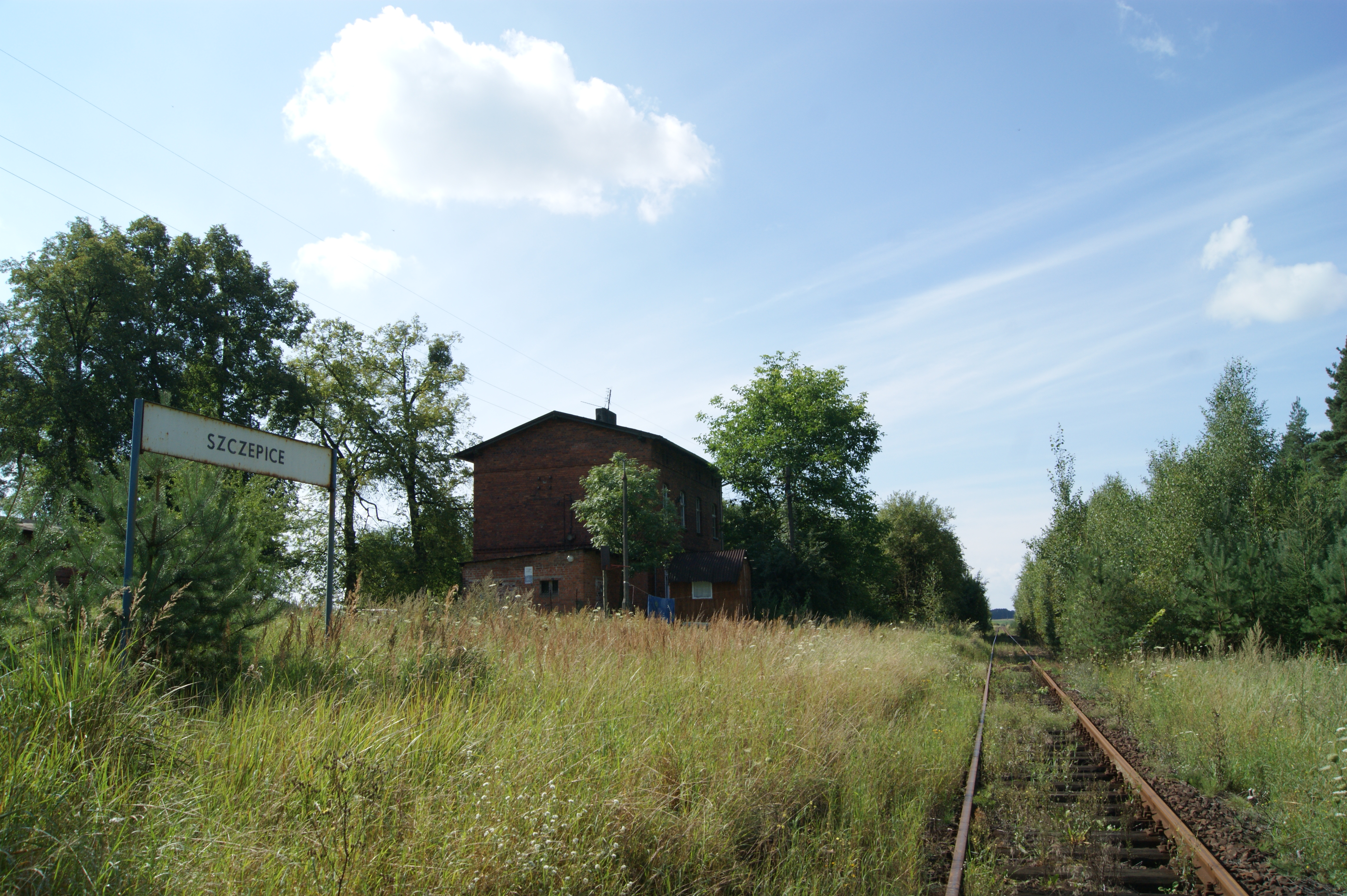
- Szczepice train stop

- Location within Poland
- Coordinates: 53°2′N 17°32′E
- Country: Poland
- Voivodeship: Kuyavian-Pomeranian
- County: Nakło
- Gmina: Kcynia

Szczepice [ʂt͡ʂɛˈpit͡sɛ] is a village in the administrative district of Gmina Kcynia, within Nakło County, in the Kuyavian-Pomeranian Voivodeship of north-central Poland. The village is situated approximately 6 kilometres (4 mi) northeast of Kcynia, 13 km (8 mi) south of Nakło nad Notecią, and 33 km (21 mi) west of Bydgoszcz.
