= Bąk =

Bąk may refer to:

== Places ==
- Bąk, Kuyavian-Pomeranian Voivodeship (north-central Poland)
- Bąk, Gmina Karsin in Pomeranian Voivodeship (north Poland)
- Bąk, Gmina Stara Kiszewa in Pomeranian Voivodeship (north Poland)

== Other ==
- Bąk (surname), Polish surname
- Kocjan Bąk, Polish motor glider
