= Baq =

Baq or BAQ may refer to:

== Places ==
- Baq, Semnan, northern Iran
- Baq, South Khorasan, eastern Iran
- Ernesto Cortissoz International Airport, Colombia (IATA:BAQ)

== Other uses ==
- Body Attitudes Questionnaire, in psychology
- Basic Allowance for Quarters, in the U.S. military
- Basque language (ISO 639:baq), spoken in Spain and France
