= Dobieszewo =

Dobieszewo may refer to the following places:

- Dobieszewo, Kuyavian-Pomeranian Voivodeship (north-central Poland)
- Dobieszewo, Pomeranian Voivodeship (north Poland)
- Dobieszewo, West Pomeranian Voivodeship (north-west Poland)
