= Studzienki =

- Village
- Location within Poland
- Coordinates: 53°4′N 17°33′E
- Country: Poland
- Voivodeship: Kuyavian-Pomeranian
- County: Nakło
- Gmina: Kcynia

Studzienki [stuˈd͡ʑɛŋki] German: Grünthal is a village in the administrative district of Gmina Kcynia, within Nakło County, Kuyavian-Pomeranian Voivodeship, in north-central Poland.
