= Miastowice =

- Village
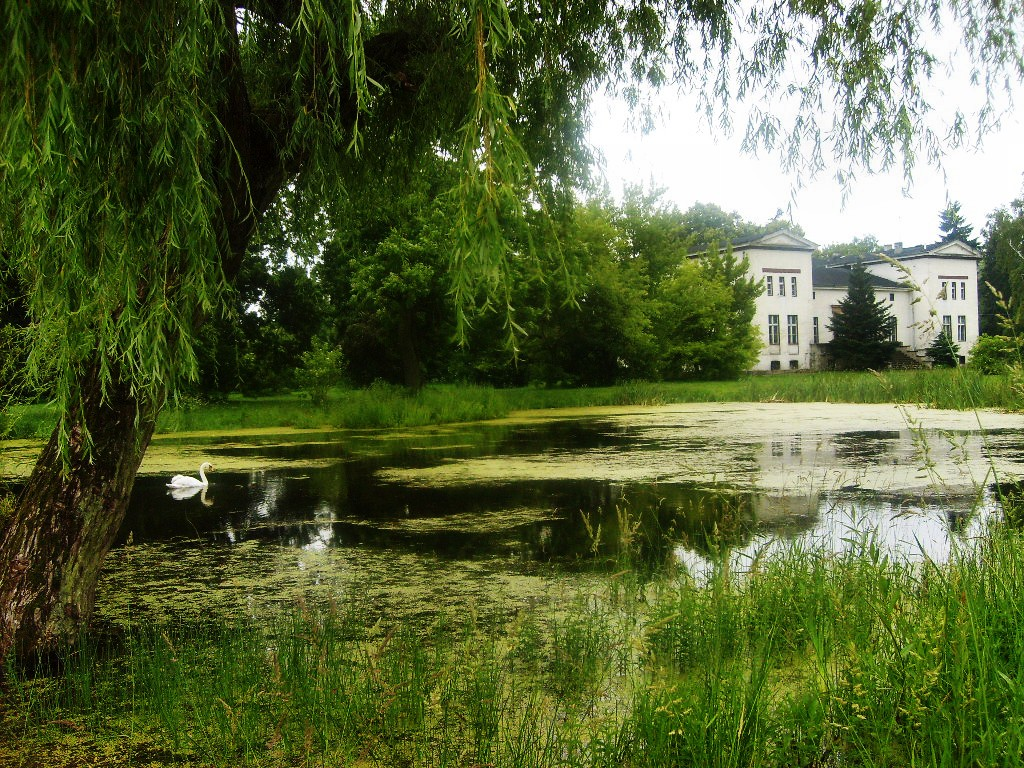
- Palace in Miastowice

- Location within Poland
- Coordinates: 52°58′N 17°32′E
- Country: Poland
- Voivodeship: Kuyavian-Pomeranian
- County: Nakło
- Gmina: Kcynia

Miastowice [mjastɔˈvit͡sɛ] is a village in the administrative district of Gmina Kcynia, within Nakło County, Kuyavian-Pomeranian Voivodeship, in north-central Poland.
