= Józefkowo, Nakło County =

Józefkowo
- Village
- Location within Poland
- Coordinates: 53°5′54″N 17°30′35″E
- Country: Poland
- Voivodeship: Kuyavian-Pomeranian
- County: Nakło
- Gmina: Kcynia

Population
  - Total: 60
- Time zone: UTC+1 (CET)
  - Summer (DST): UTC+2 (CEST)
- Vehicle registration: CNA

Józefkowo [juzɛfˈkɔvɔ] is a village in the administrative district of Gmina Kcynia, within Nakło County, Kuyavian-Pomeranian Voivodeship, in north-central Poland.

Eleven Polish citizens were murdered by Nazi Germany in the village during World War II.
