= Krzepiszyn =

- Village
- Location within Poland
- Coordinates: 52°59′25″N 17°32′36″E
- Country: Poland
- Voivodeship: Kuyavian-Pomeranian
- County: Nakło
- Gmina: Kcynia

Krzepiszyn [kʂɛˈpiʂɨn] is a village in the administrative district of Gmina Kcynia, within Nakło County, Kuyavian-Pomeranian Voivodeship, in north-central Poland.
