= Bonk (surname) =

Bonk is a surname. It is a variant of the Polish surname Bąk ([ˈbɔŋk]), which has several meanings, including Botaurus (a genus of birds in the heron family), horse-fly, child, and bumblebee.

== People ==
- Bartłomiej Bonk (born 1984), Polish weightlifter
- Charles S. Bonk (1920–1976), American businessman and politician
- Gerd Bonk (1951–2014), German weightlifter
- Harry Bonk (1926–2011), American football player
- James Bonk (1931–2013), American chemist and academic
- John Bonk (born 1950), Canadian football player
- Joseph Bonk (born 1976), American sailor and academic
- Julia Bonk (born 1986), German politician
- Keiko Bonk (born 1954), American politician
- Oliver Bonk (born 2005), Canadian ice hockey player
- Radek Bonk (born 1976), Czech ice hockey player
- Roger Bonk (1944–2023), American football player
- Steven Bonk, Canadian politician
- Tino Bonk (born 1967), German bobsledder
