= Kazimierzewo, Nakło County =

Kazimierzewo
- Village
- Location within Poland
- Coordinates: 53°3′N 17°26′E
- Country: Poland
- Voivodeship: Kuyavian-Pomeranian
- County: Nakło
- Gmina: Kcynia

Kazimierzewo [kaʑimjɛˈʐɛvɔ] is a village in the administrative district of Gmina Kcynia, within Nakło County, Kuyavian-Pomeranian Voivodeship, in north-central Poland.
