= Malice, Kuyavian-Pomeranian Voivodeship =

Malice
- Village
- Location within Poland
- Coordinates: 53°00′02″N 17°32′04″E
- Country: Poland
- Voivodeship: Kuyavian-Pomeranian
- County: Nakło
- Gmina: Kcynia

Malice [maˈlit͡sɛ] is a village in the administrative district of Gmina Kcynia, within Nakło County, Kuyavian-Pomeranian Voivodeship, in north-central Poland.
