= Smogulecka Wieś =

- Village
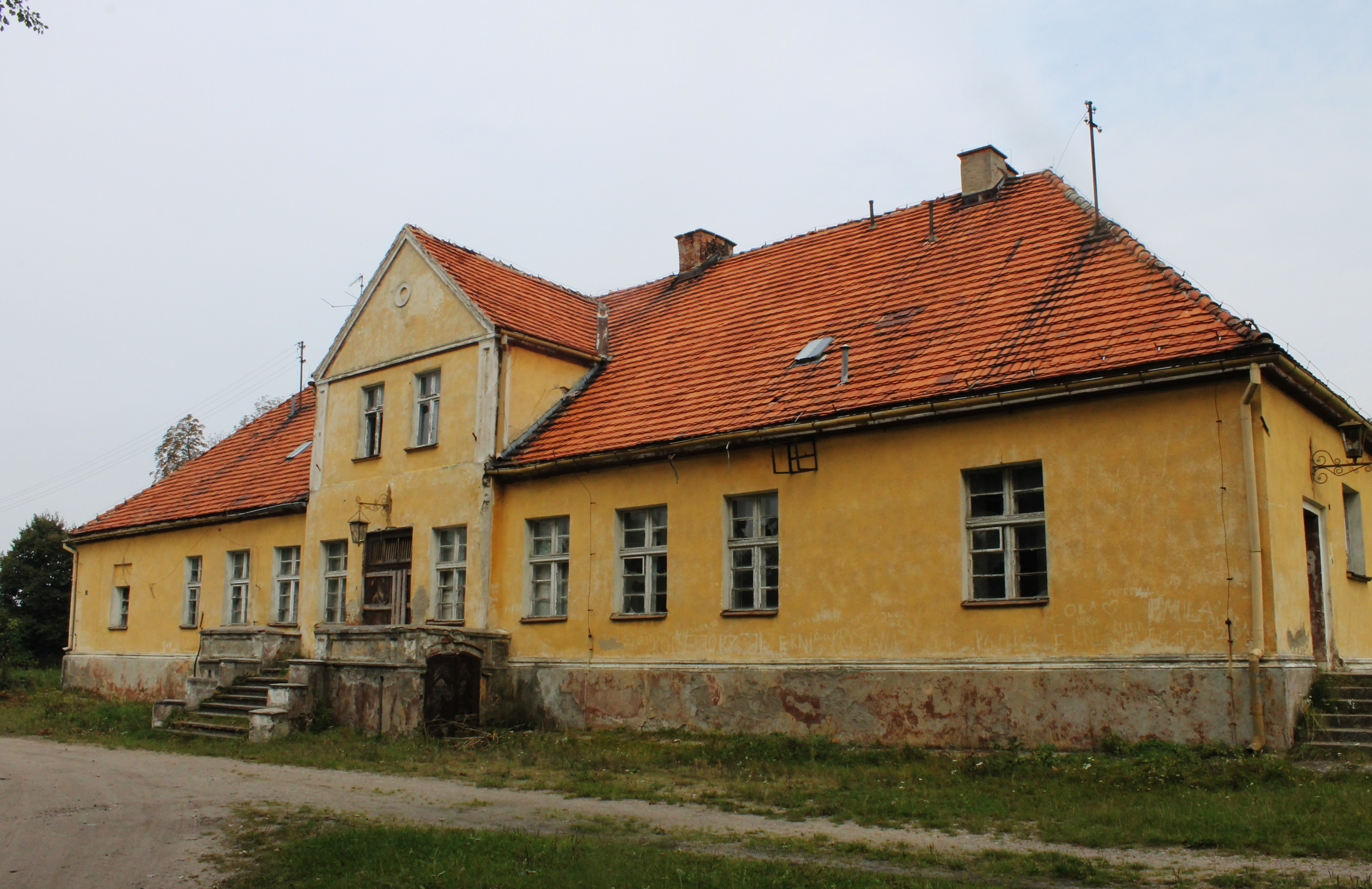
- Smogulecka Wieś, a manor complex

- Location within Poland
- Coordinates: 53°01′53″N 17°20′53″E
- Country: Poland
- Voivodeship: Kuyavian-Pomeranian
- County: Nakło
- Gmina: Kcynia

Smogulecka Wieś [smɔɡuˈlɛt͡ska ˈvjɛɕ] is a village in the administrative district of Gmina Kcynia, within Nakło County, Kuyavian-Pomeranian Voivodeship, in north-central Poland.
