= Dębogóra, Kuyavian-Pomeranian Voivodeship =

Dębogóra
- Village
- Location within Poland
- Coordinates: 53°3′N 17°29′E
- Country: Poland
- Voivodeship: Kuyavian-Pomeranian
- County: Nakło
- Gmina: Kcynia

Dębogóra [dɛmbɔˈɡura] is a village in the administrative district of Gmina Kcynia, within Nakło County, Kuyavian-Pomeranian Voivodeship, in north-central Poland.
