= Elizewo =

- Villag2
- Location within Poland
- Coordinates: 53°1′23″N 17°35′36″E
- Country: Poland
- Voivodeship: Kuyavian-Pomeranian
- County: Nakło
- Gmina: Kcynia

Elizewo [ɛliˈzɛvɔ] is a village in the administrative district of Gmina Kcynia, within Nakło County, Kuyavian-Pomeranian Voivodeship, in north-central Poland.
