= Zabłocie, Kuyavian-Pomeranian Voivodeship =

Zabłocie
- Village
- Location within Poland
- Coordinates: 53°1′53″N 17°33′11″E
- Country: Poland
- Voivodeship: Kuyavian-Pomeranian
- County: Nakło
- Gmina: Kcynia
- Population: 20

Zabłocie [zaˈbwɔt͡ɕɛ] is a village in the administrative district of Gmina Kcynia, within Nakło County, Kuyavian-Pomeranian Voivodeship, in north-central Poland.
