= Weronika, Kuyavian-Pomeranian Voivodeship =

Weronika
- Village
- Location within Poland
- Coordinates: 53°4′52″N 17°27′30″E
- Country: Poland
- Voivodeship: Kuyavian-Pomeranian
- County: Nakło
- Gmina: Kcynia
- Population: 80

Weronika (Polish pronunciation: [vɛrɔˈɲika]) is a village in the administrative district of Gmina Kcynia, within Nakło County, Kuyavian-Pomeranian Voivodeship, in north-central Poland.
