= Karolinowo, Kuyavian-Pomeranian Voivodeship =

Karolinowo
- Village
- Location within Poland
- Coordinates: 52°59′40″N 17°22′20″E
- Country: Poland
- Voivodeship: Kuyavian-Pomeranian
- County: Nakło
- Gmina: Kcynia
- Population: 60

Karolinowo [karɔliˈnɔvɔ] is a village in the administrative district of Gmina Kcynia, within Nakło County, Kuyavian-Pomeranian Voivodeship, in north-central Poland.
