= Grocholin =

- Village
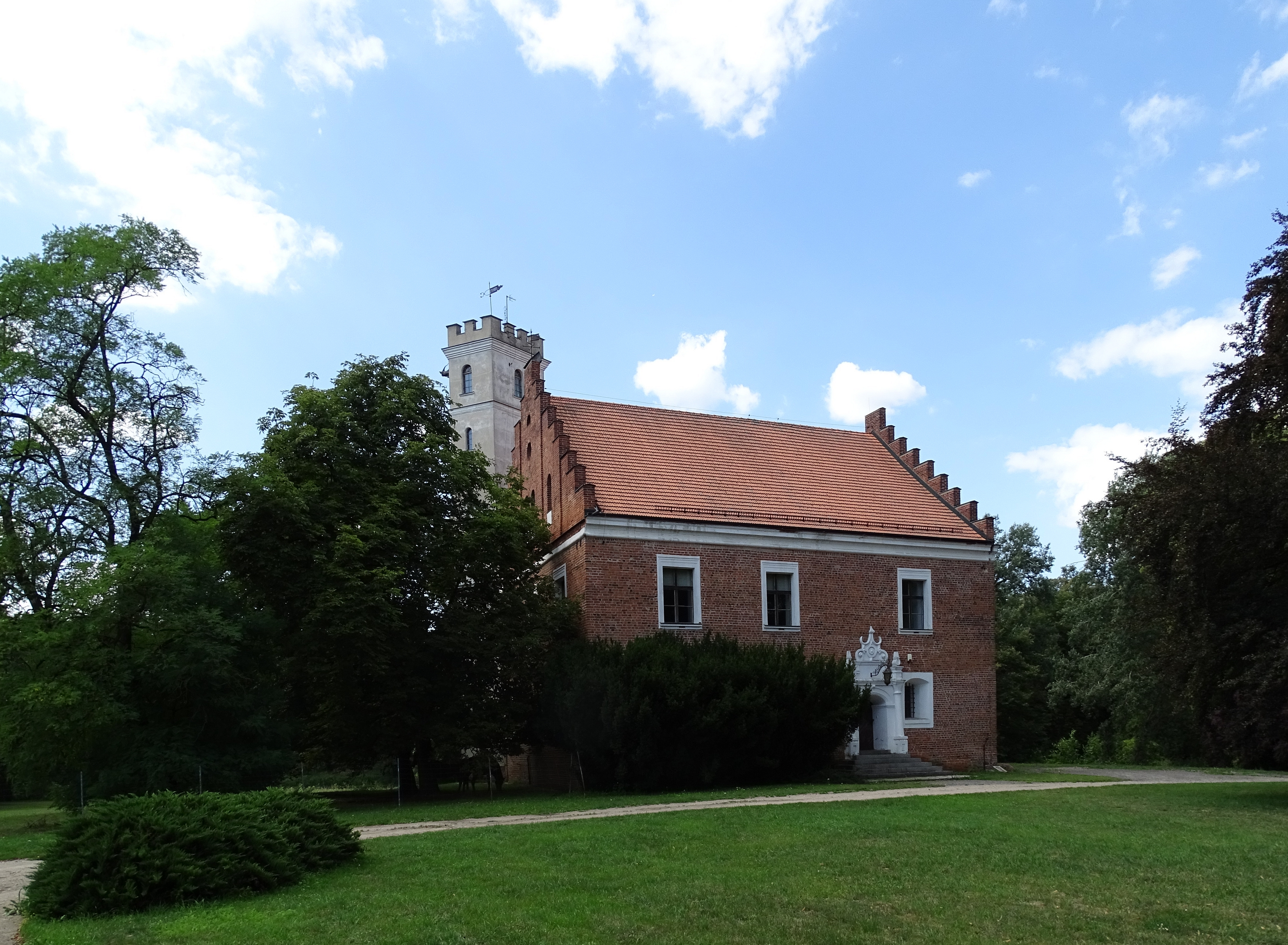
- Manor house erected at the turn of the 16th and 17th centuries.

- Location within Poland
- Coordinates: 52°59′24″N 17°25′36″E
- Country: Poland
- Voivodeship: Kuyavian-Pomeranian
- County: Nakło
- Gmina: Kcynia
- Population: 520
- Website: http://www.grocholin.pl

Grocholin [ɡrɔˈxɔlin] is a village in the administrative district of Gmina Kcynia, within Nakło County, Kuyavian-Pomeranian Voivodeship, in north-central Poland.
