= Ujazd, Kuyavian-Pomeranian Voivodeship =

Ujazd
- Village
- Location within Poland
- Coordinates: 53°00′11″N 17°30′49″E
- Country: Poland
- Voivodeship: Kuyavian-Pomeranian
- County: Nakło
- Gmina: Kcynia

Ujazd [ˈujast] is a village in the administrative district of Gmina Kcynia, within Nakło County, Kuyavian-Pomeranian Voivodeship, in north-central Poland.
