= Gmina Kcynia =

Gmina Kcynia Kcynia Commune
- Gmina
- Flag Coat of arms
- Interactive map of Gmina Kcynia
- Coordinates (Kcynia): 52°59′31″N 17°29′4″E
- Country: Poland
- Voivodeship: Kuyavian-Pomeranian
- County: Nakło
- Seat: Kcynia

Area
  - Total: 297.02 km^{2} (114.68 sq mi)

Population (2006)
  - Total: 13,730
  - Density: 46.23/km^{2} (119.7/sq mi)
  - Urban: 4,679
  - Rural: 9,051
- Website: http://www.kcynia.pl/

Gmina Kcynia is an urban-rural gmina (administrative district) in Nakło County, Kuyavian-Pomeranian Voivodeship, in north-central Poland. Its seat is the town of Kcynia, which lies approximately 18 kilometres (11 mi) south-west of Nakło nad Notecią and 38 km (24 mi) west of Bydgoszcz.

The gmina covers an area of 297.02 square kilometres (114.7 sq mi), and as of 2006 its total population is 13,730 (out of which the population of Kcynia amounts to 4,679, and the population of the rural part of the gmina is 9,051).

== Villages ==
Apart from the town of Kcynia, Gmina Kcynia contains the villages and settlements of:

- Bąk
- Chwaliszewo
- Dębogóra
- Dobieszewko
- Dobieszewo
- Dziewierzewo
- Elizewo
- Głogowiniec
- Górki Dąbskie
- Górki Zagajne
- Grocholin
- Gromadno
- Iwno
- Józefkowo
- Karmelita
- Karolinowo
- Kazimierzewo
- Kowalewko
- Kowalewko-Folwark
- Krzepiszyn
- Łankowice
- Laskownica
- Ludwikowo
- Malice
- Miaskowo
- Miastowice
- Mieczkowo
- Mycielowo
- Nowa Wieś Notecka
- Palmierowo
- Paulina
- Piotrowo
- Rozpętek
- Rozstrzębowo
- Sierniki
- Sipiory
- Słupowa
- Słupowiec
- Smogulecka Wieś
- Stalówka
- Studzienki
- Suchoręcz
- Suchoręczek
- Szczepice
- Tupadły
- Turzyn
- Ujazd
- Weronika
- Włodzimierzewo
- Zabłocie
- Żarczyn
- Żurawia

== Neighbouring gminas ==
Gmina Kcynia is bordered by the gminas of Gołańcz, Nakło nad Notecią, Sadki, Szubin, Wapno, Wyrzysk and Żnin.
