= Górki Dąbskie =

- Village
- Location within Poland
- Coordinates: 52°55′15″N 17°35′09″E
- Country: Poland
- Voivodeship: Kuyavian-Pomeranian
- County: Nakło
- Gmina: Kcynia

Górki Dąbskie [ˈɡurki ˈdɔmpskʲɛ] is a village in the administrative district of Gmina Kcynia, within Nakło County, Kuyavian-Pomeranian Voivodeship, in north-central Poland.
