= Chwaliszewo, Kuyavian-Pomeranian Voivodeship =

Chwaliszewo
- Village
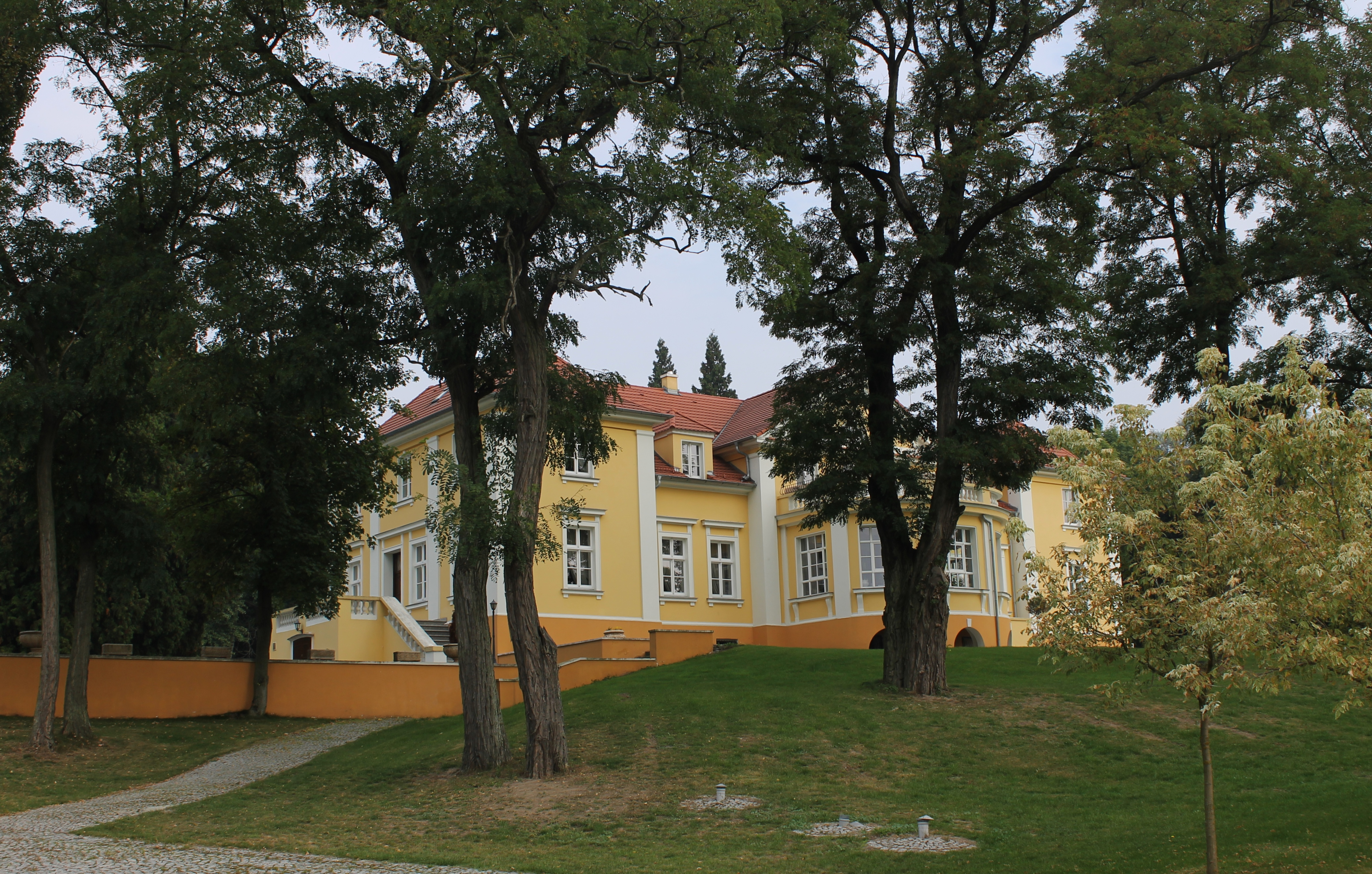
- Palace in the village

- Location within Poland
- Coordinates: 53°01′07″N 17°22′43″E
- Country: Poland
- Voivodeship: Kuyavian-Pomeranian
- County: Nakło
- Gmina: Kcynia

Population
  - Total: 410

Chwaliszewo [xfaliˈʂɛvɔ] is a village in the administrative district of Gmina Kcynia, within Nakło County, Kuyavian-Pomeranian Voivodeship, in north-central Poland.
