= Jan Czochralski =

Polish chemist (1885–1953)

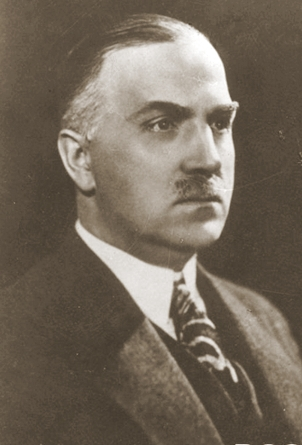
- Jan Czochralski ca. 1910
- Born: 23 October 1885; Exin, German Empire
- Died: 22 April 1953 (aged 67); Poznań, Poland
- Citizenship: Polish
- Education: Technische Universität Berlin
- Known for: Czochralski method B-metal
- Spouse: Marguerite Haase
- Scientific career
- Fields: Chemistry, metallurgy
- Workplaces: Warsaw University of Technology

Jan Czochralski (Polish pronunciation: [ˈjan t͡ʂɔˈxralskʲi]; 23 October 1885 – 22 April 1953) was a Polish chemist who invented the Czochralski method, which is used for growing single crystals and in the production of semiconductor wafers. It is still used in over 90 percent of all electronics in the world that use semiconductors. He is the most cited Polish scholar.

There is evidence that Czochralski sheltered two Jewish women in his home until the Warsaw Uprising to save them from the Germans and some evidence that he was instrumental in financially helping a previously owned Jewish business in the ghetto.

== Life and career ==
Czochralski was born in what was then Exin in the Prussian Province of Posen, German Empire (now Kcynia, Poland). Around 1900 he moved to Berlin, where he worked at a pharmacy. He was educated at the Technische Hochschule in Charlottenburg (today Technische Universität Berlin), where he specialized in metal chemistry. Czochralski began working as an engineer for Allgemeine Elektrizitäts Gesellschaft (AEG) in 1907.

He discovered the Czochralski method in 1916, when he accidentally dipped his pen into a crucible of molten tin rather than his inkwell. He immediately pulled his pen out to discover that a thin thread of solidified metal was hanging from the nib. The nib was replaced by a capillary, and Czochralski verified that the crystallized metal was a single crystal. Czochralski's experiments produced single crystals a millimeter in diameter and up to 150 centimeters long. He published a paper on his discovery in 1918 in the Zeitschrift für Physikalische Chemie, a German chemistry journal, under the title "Ein neues Verfahren zur Messung der Kristallisationsgeschwindigkeit der Metalle" [A new method for the measurement of the crystallization rate of metals], since the method was at that time used for measuring the crystallization rate of metals such as tin, zinc and lead. In 1948, Americans Gordon K. Teal and J.B. Little from Bell Labs would use the method to grow single germanium crystals, leading to its use in semiconductor production.

In 1917, Czochralski organized the research laboratory "Metallbank und Metallurgische Gesellschaft", which he directed until 1928. In 1919 he was one of the founding members of the German Society for Metals Science (Deutsche Gesellschaft für Metallkunde), of which he was president until 1925. In 1924, Czochralski patented a metal alloy known as B-metal, which was perfect for the manufacturing of bearings for railway carriages as it did not contain expensive tin. The German railways were the first institution to buy the patent. B-metal allowed trains to travel at higher speeds and played a significant role in the development of rail transport in Germany, Poland, the United States, the United Kingdom, and the Soviet Union. Czochralski's achievements brought him international recognition. In 1925, he became the president of the German Association of Metallurgists. He was also invited by Henry Ford to visit his factories and offered the position of director at his new aluminum factory, but Czochralski declined.

In 1928, at the request of the president of Poland, Ignacy Mościcki, he moved to Poland and was appointed the Professor of Metallurgy and Metal Research at the Chemistry Department of the Warsaw University of Technology. He also became one of the first individuals to receive the university's honorary degrees. In the 1930s, his institute acquired new equipment and facilities, which were used for research into materials for military armaments and some for civilian use. Following Germany's invasion of Poland, senior German officials visited him, hoping to use his facility for their own purposes. During the German occupation of Warsaw, more restrictions on daily life were imposed on the population; however, Czochralski was able to live largely undisturbed.

After World War II, he was stripped of his professorship by the communist regime due to his involvement with Germany during the war, although he was later cleared of any wrongdoing by a Polish court. He returned to his native town of Kcynia, where he ran a small cosmetics and household chemicals firm until his death in 1953.

== Remembrance ==
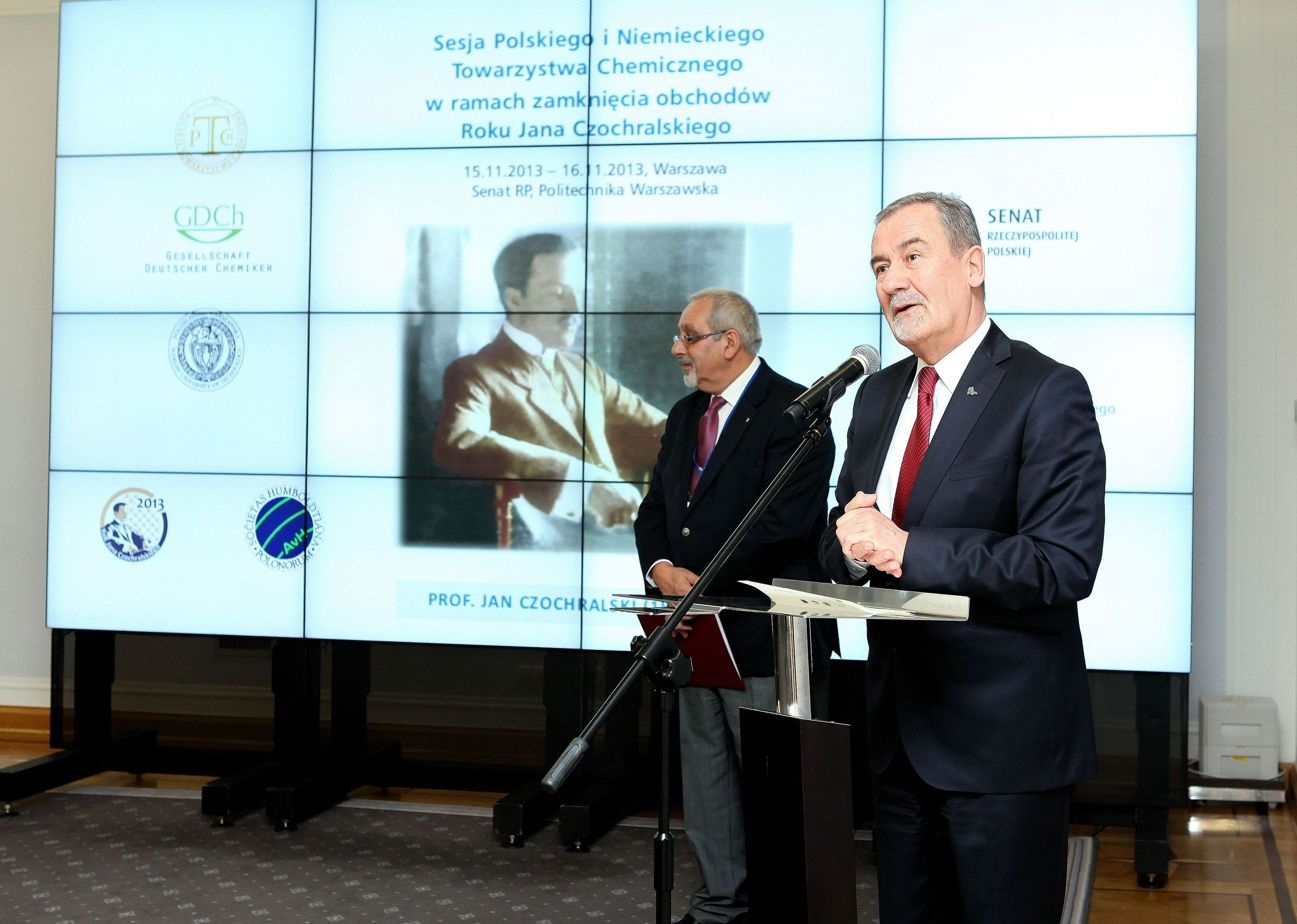
Opening a seminar in memory of Jan Czochralski organized by Polish Chemical Society and European Association for Chemical and Molecular Sciences (EuCheMS) in the Polish Senate (2013).

As a way to commemorate him, a number of places in Poland were named after Czochralski including schools and streets in such cities like Gdańsk, Poznań, Bydgoszcz and Wrocław.

In 2004, the European Materials Research Society established the Jan Czochralski Gold Medal for contributions to materials science in honour of the Polish scientist.

In 2009, the Polish Post issued a series of four commemorative stamps. The stamp with a denomination of PLN 1,55 depicted Czochralski.

In 2012, the Polish Parliament passed a resolution to name 2013 as "The Year of Jan Czochralski".

In 2016, a team of Polish mineralogists led by Łukasz Karwowski from the Silesian University and Andrzej Muszyński from the Adam Mickiewicz University named a newly discovered mineral czochralskiit in honour of the Polish chemist. It was discovered during scientific works in the Morasko Meteorite Nature Reserve.

In 2018, a comic book by Maciej Jasiński and Jacek Michalski entitled Jan Czochralski. The Man Who Changed the World (Polish: "Jan Czochralski. Człowiek, który zmienił świat") was officially published.

In 2019, a commemorative IEEE Milestone plaque honouring Czochralski's scientific achievements was ceremonially unveiled at the Warsaw University of Technology.

In 2019, a square in front of the Mill of Knowledge Innovation Centre in Toruń was named in memory of Czochralski.

== Citizenship ==
Jan Czochralski renounced his German citizenship. His brother was murdered by the Germans at the beginning of the Second World War.

== Publications ==
- Moderne Metallkunde in Theorie und Praxis, J. Czochralski, published by Springer, Berlin, 1924.

== See also ==
- List of Poles
- Timeline of Polish science and technology
