= Dobieszewko, Kuyavian-Pomeranian Voivodeship =

Dobieszewko
- Village
- Location within Poland
- Coordinates: 52°59′3″N 17°20′29″E
- Country: Poland
- Voivodeship: Kuyavian-Pomeranian
- County: Nakło
- Gmina: Kcynia
- Population: 150

Dobieszewko [dɔbjɛˈʂɛfkɔ] is a village in the administrative district of Gmina Kcynia, within Nakło County, Kuyavian-Pomeranian Voivodeship, in north-central Poland.
