= Bak (surname) =

Bak is a surname. Notable people with the surname include:

- Aad Bak (1926–2009), Dutch footballer
- Alexander Bak (born 1991), Danish basketball player
- Børge Bak (1912–1990), Danish inventor, violinist, chemist and professor
- Elin Ekblom Bak (born 1981), Swedish football midfielder
- Per Bak (1948–2002), Danish physicist
- Robert C. Bak, Hungarian psychoanalyst
- Samuel Bak (born 1933), Israeli artist
- Stéphane Bak (born 1996), French actor and radio host of Congolese descent
- Thomas Bak (born 1978), German artist and art director
- Thomas H. Bak (born 1961), Polish-British cognitive neuroscientist
