= Klara Prillowa =

Polish artist, social activist, 20th century

- Born: 11 February 1907; Bromberg, German Empire
- Died: 6 October 1991 (aged 84); Kcynia, Poland
- Resting place: 52°59′31″N 17°29′04″E
- Known for: Sculpture, Folklorist
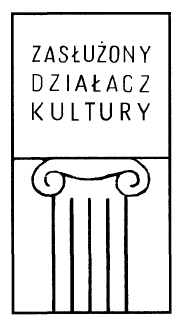
- Awards

Klara Prillowa (1907–1991), was a Polish sculptor, social activist and amateur ethnographer. She championed the collection and dissemination of folk culture artifacts.

== Biography ==
=== Youth ===
Klara Prillowa was born to a middle-class family on 11 February 1907, in the "Wilczak" district of then Bromberg. She was the daughter of Maksymilian Gackowski and Wanda née Nowakowska. Klara's father was a craftsman, installing railway signal devices.

The family relocated regularly: after Bydgoszcz, they moved to Miłosław, Środa Wielkopolska, Grodzisk Wielkopolski and Zbąszyń. In the latter, Klara completed a seven-year elementary school.

Later, the family moved to back to Bydgoszcz, where his father started working as a typesetter in one of the local printing houses. In her childhood, Klara already displayed a great artistic talent, being especially interested in sculpture and music. At the age of ten, she began learning to play the violin.

In 1931, she married Paweł Prill, a painter who specialized in church polychromes. He notably collaborated with Polish painter and conservator Wiktor Gosieniecki (1876–1956). After the wedding, Klara moved to her husband's workshop located in Kcynia near Szubin (40 kilometres (25 mi) southwest of Bydgoszcz).

In 1937, they had a son, named Maksymilian, in line with family traditions (like Klara's father and brother). Five years later, their daughter Jadwiga was born.

=== Artistic period ===
Klara's creative activity began when she was twenty (1927), before meeting his future husband.

In Kcynia, in the backyard of the family house -located at 4 Ogrodowa street- Klara Prillowa set up a small sculpture workshop, where she had been working eventually for almost 50 years, at the heart of the Pałuki area.

She was interested in the regional Pałuki culture, crafting local figurines and characters. After World War II, her activity attracted Kcynia residents, people interested in art and folk traditions. From 1947, she had been running in Kcynia a sculpture school for children.

During a 3-year spell (1949–1951), Prillowa attended and graduated from an art course for adults in Bydgoszcz. She then returned to her studio.

This period matches her first meeting with Maria Znamierowska-Prüfferowa (1898–1990), an ethnographer, professor at the Nicolaus Copernicus University in Toruń and founder of the Ethnographic Museum of Toruń.

Maria was the first to consider with interest Klara's work and make her sculptures known within the ethnographic community. In 1953, they both went to the Pomeranian Museum in Toruń to discover the permanent exhibition of folk art in northern Poland. A year later, they visited the "Main Agriculture Exhibition" set Lublin, which had an influence on Klara's work.

Prillowa was also influenced by Anna Jachnina (1914–1996), a Polish radio reporter and editor of Radio PiK (Polskie Radio Pomorza i Kujaw -Polish Radio of Kujawy, Pomeranian Voivodeship), the local antenna of the national Polskie Radio.

In her broadcasts, Anna was collecting materials about the cultural life in villages and reporting old rituals and folk customs. Klara immediately subscribed to this scheme: their collaboration lasted for 30 years, contributing to the realisation of more than 300 programs about the customs, culture, traditions and music of Pałuki origin.

In nearly 50 years, it is estimated she produced thousands of figurines.

=== Social and didactic works ===
Klara Prillowa was interested in local folklore. She spent a lot of time collecting elements of folk culture from Pałuki region (songs and legends). Hiking around the area, she gathered material and non-material pieces of folklore. Furthermore, she wrote down melodies and learned old dances.

Around 1952, she became a member of the "Polish Ethnological Society": she then founded the "Circle of Pałuki Lovers in Kcynia" (Polish: Koło Miłośników Pałuk w Kcyni).

Her studio was often the place of meetings with performers (dancing and singing), storytellers recollecting old weddings, traditional customs and rituals. In 1953 Klara founded Pałuki, a regional song and dance ensemble, gathering three generations of people. The set-up of this band required to design regional embroidery-and-lace costumes and get ancient traditional music instruments. The group became known among the folk bands of northern Poland, being regularly invited to various regional and national events and festivals.

With time, Klara's busy house began to run out of space. This triggered the project of building a dedicated edifice: the "Regional Community Center" was unveiled on 8 December 1956, with Prillowa at its head. These new premises sheltered 14 different bands and choirs, all under her direction. In particular, there were various courses and demonstrations of traditional lace-making embroidery, drawing, carving and cut-out lessons. At the end of 1958, a cultural happening opened the exhibition of Pałuki folk art in Kcynia's center: it was the outcome of the collaboration of Klara and Halina Mikułowska, an ethnographer from Toruń. In 1961, she organized a new exhibition, "The Pałuckie Wedding" (Polish: Wesele pałuckie).

In 1963, the "Kujawsko-Pałuckie Cultural Society" (Polish: Kujawsko-Pałuckie Towarzystwo Kulturalne) was established in nearby Szubin, as a branch of the "Kuyavian-Pomeranian Center of Culture" in Bydgoszcz (Polish: Kujawsko-Pomorskie Centrum Kultury w Bydgoszczy – KPCK). Klara was its vice-president.

In May 1964, the "Pałuki" band gave a concert at the Bydgoszcz Chamber theatre in Grodzka Street and in 1970, Polish Television recorded two programs about Pałuki music and dances, including local folk artists.

In 1972, Prillowa went abroad for the first time, to the Yugoslavian International Folk Festival of Zagreb.

In 1973, she exhibited at the post-competition show "Nicolaus Copernicus in folk sculpture" (Polish: „Mikołaj Kopernik w rzeźbie ludowej") in Toruń.

On 3 January 1977, at the age of seventy, Prillowa suffered an accident and required several months of convalescence. Following this event, she retired and moved to live with her son in Poznań.

She died in 1991 and was buried at the parish cemetery in Kcynia.

=== Awards ===
- Recipient of the Order of Polonia Restituta (Knight's Cross);
- Badge of the Meritorious Activist of Culture;
- Recipient of the Polish Oskar Kolberg's prize (1978), highlighting Prillowa's works carrying "[...] elaborated decorative details reflecting faithfully portrayed figures. They are mainly characters from rural life: women and men of various professions and in various ritual scenes, children, musicians, carol singers, dance couples [...]. She also carved Christmas, multi-figure scenes with religious content".

Klara Prillowa received a scholarship from the Ministry of Culture and National Heritage.

Since Klara's time, the "Pałuk Folk Art Competition" has been organized continuously for more than sixty years by the House of Culture of Szubiń.

In 2017, the Kcynia city Council adopted a resolution awarding Prillowa with the title of "Honorary Citizen" of the city. Additionally, the city Cultural and Library Center in Kcynia has been named after her.

== Gallery ==
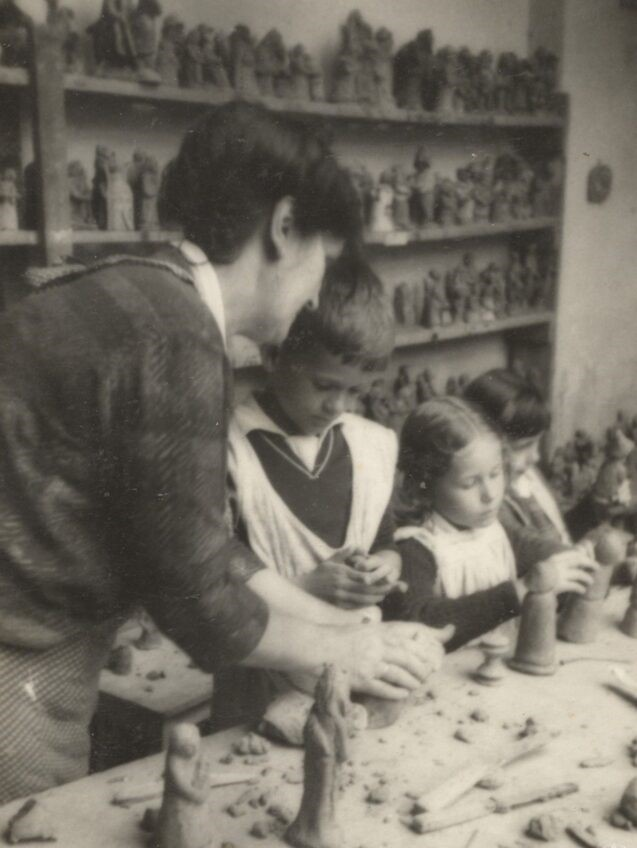
Klara Prillowa giving lessons at the Regional Community Center

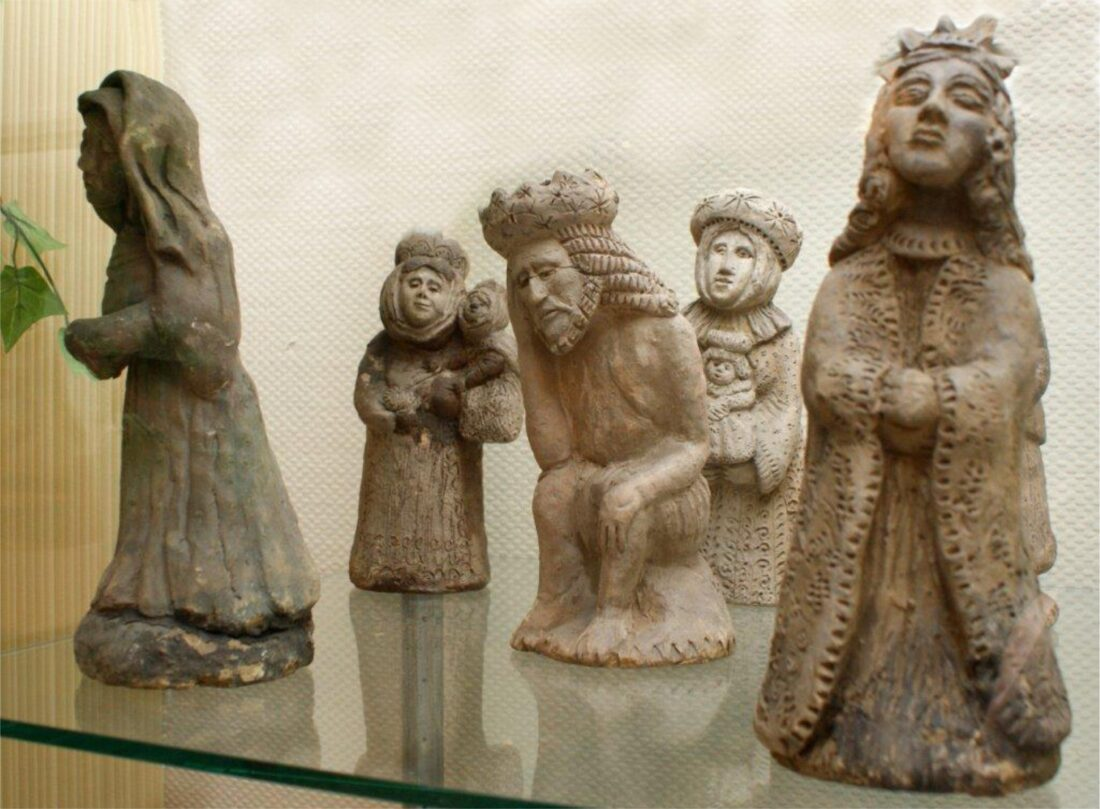
Prillowa's figurines

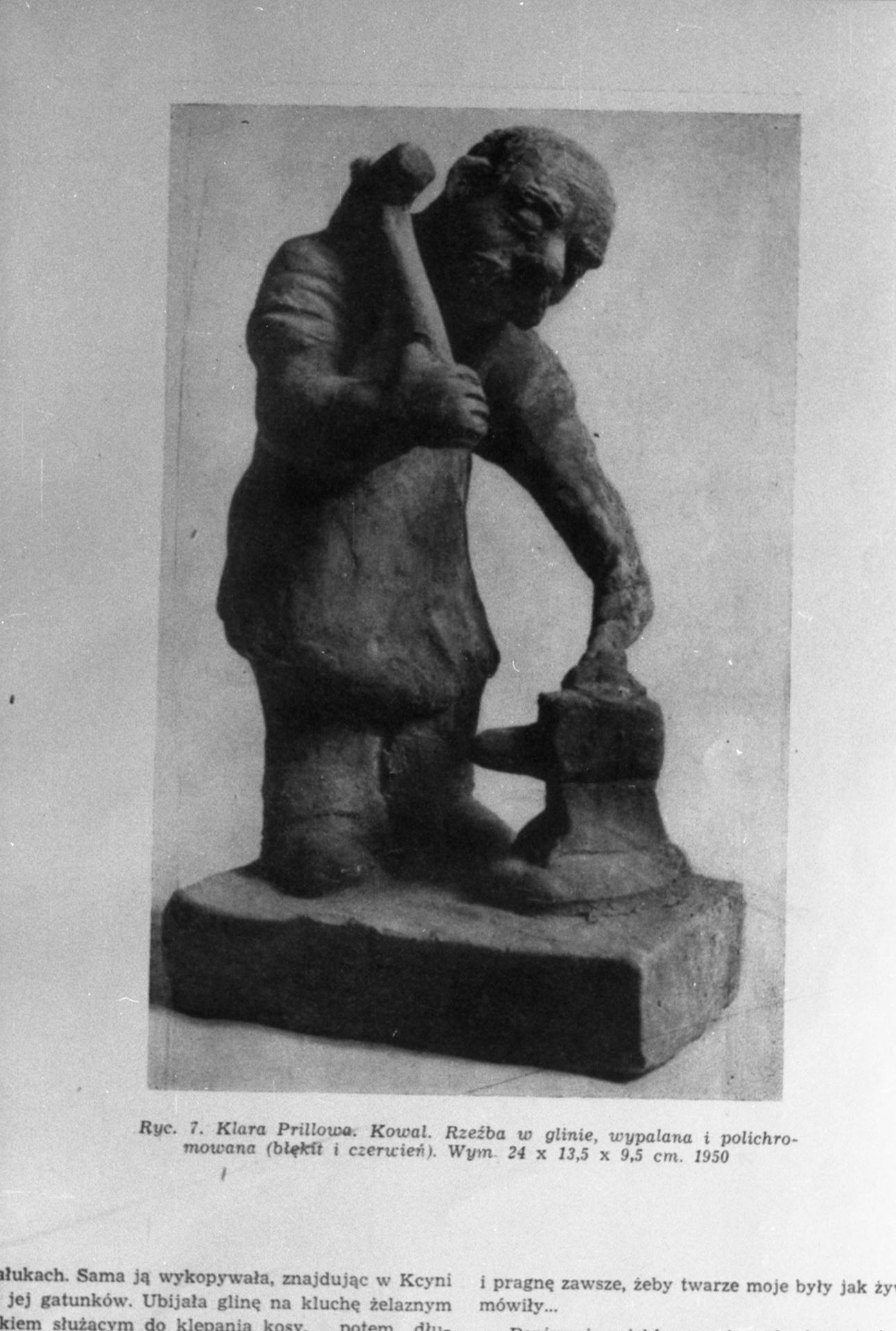
"Blacksmith" by Klara Prillowa, clay and polychrome

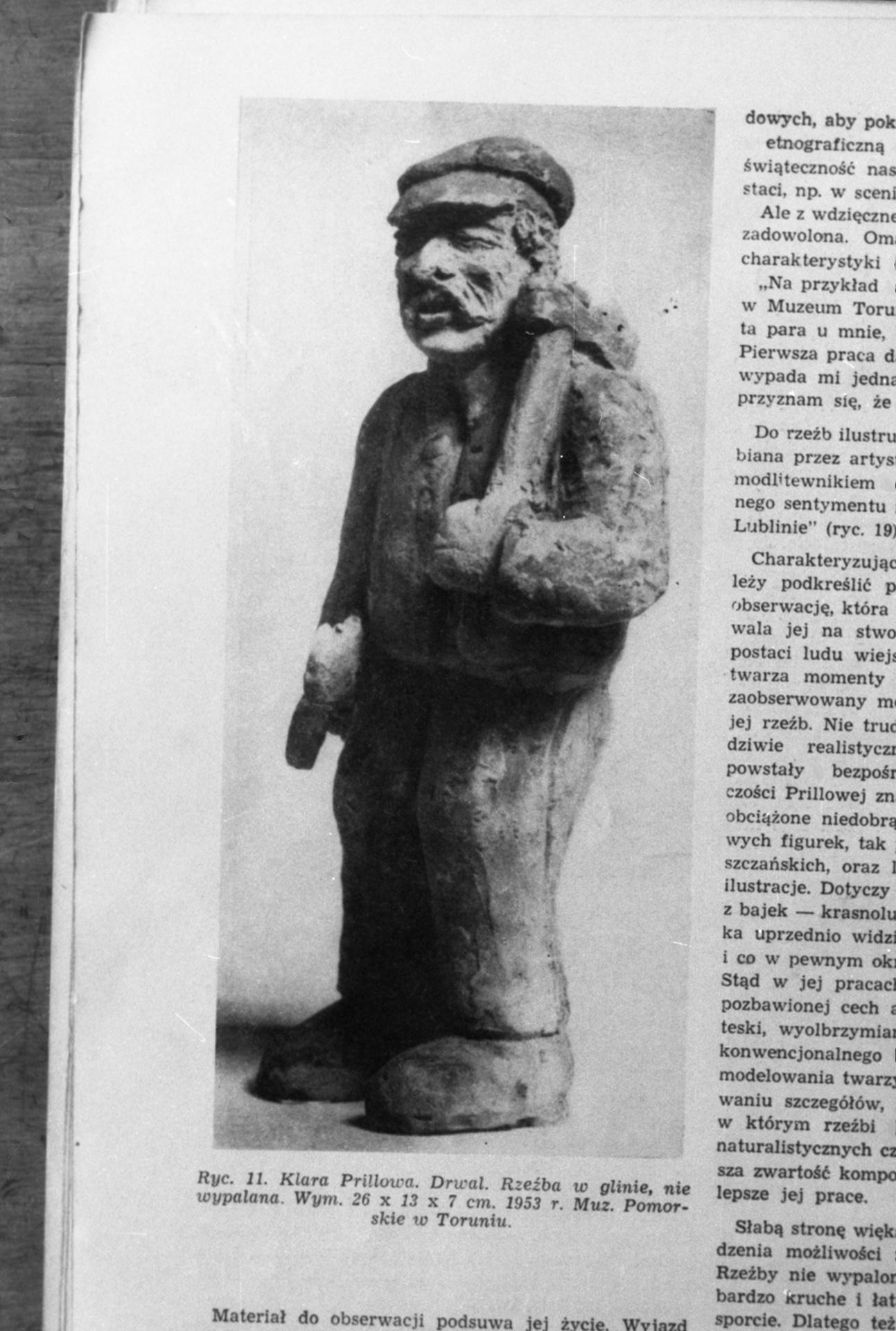
Lumberjack by Klara Prillowa, clay and polychrome

== See also ==
- Bydgoszcz
- List of Polish sculptors
- List of Polish people

== Bibliography ==
- (in Polish) Błażejewski, Stanisław; Kutta, Janusz; Romaniuk, Marek (1997). Bydgoski Słownik Biograficzny. Tom IV. Bydgoszcz: Kujawsko-Pomorskie Towarzystwo Kulturalne. pp. 109–110. ISBN 8385327428.
- (in Polish) Fryś-Pietrzaszkowa, Ewa; Kowalska-Lewicka, Anna; Spiss, Anna (2002). Etnografowie i ludoznawcy polscy: sylwetki, szkice biograficzne. t. 1. Kraków: Naukowe DWN; Oddział Polskiego Towarzystwa Ludoznawczego.
