= Karmelita =

- Village
- Location within Poland
- Coordinates: 53°00′37″N 17°29′13″E
- Country: Poland
- Voivodeship: Kuyavian-Pomeranian
- County: Nakło
- Gmina: Kcynia
- Population: 79

Karmelita [karmɛˈlita] is a village in the administrative district of Gmina Kcynia, within Nakło County, Kuyavian-Pomeranian Voivodeship, in north-central Poland.
