= Żurawia, Kuyavian-Pomeranian Voivodeship =

Żurawia
- Village
- Location within Poland
- Coordinates: 52°58′22″N 17°29′55″E
- Country: Poland
- Voivodeship: Kuyavian-Pomeranian
- County: Nakło
- Gmina: Kcynia

Żurawia [ʐuˈravja] is a village in the administrative district of Gmina Kcynia, within Nakło County, Kuyavian-Pomeranian Voivodeship, in north-central Poland.
