= Kowalewko-Folwark =

- Village
- Location within Poland
- Coordinates: 53°05′20″N 17°28′51″E
- Country: Poland
- Voivodeship: Kuyavian-Pomeranian
- County: Nakło
- Gmina: Kcynia

Kowalewko-Folwark [kɔvaˈlɛfkɔ ˈfɔlvark] is a village in the administrative district of Gmina Kcynia, within Nakło County, Kuyavian-Pomeranian Voivodeship, in north-central Poland.
