= Kowalewko, Kuyavian-Pomeranian Voivodeship =

Kowalewko
- Village
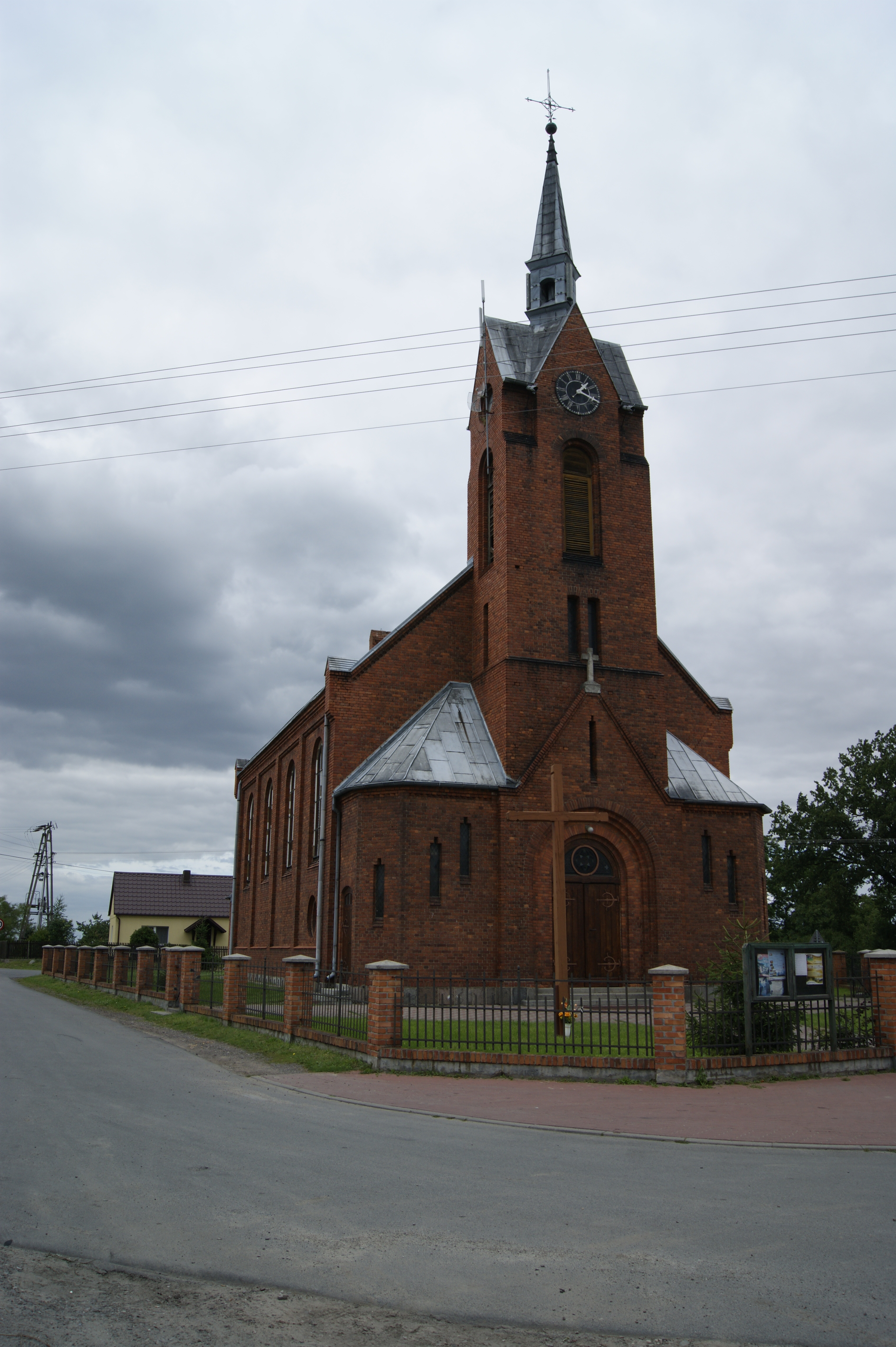
- Church of the Assumption of Blessed Virgin Mary in Kowalewko

- Location within Poland
- Coordinates: 53°4′19″N 17°25′53″E
- Country: Poland
- Voivodeship: Kuyavian-Pomeranian
- County: Nakło
- Gmina: Kcynia
- Time zone: UTC+1 (CET)
  - Summer (DST): UTC+2 (CEST)
- Vehicle registration: CNA

Kowalewko [kɔvaˈlɛfkɔ] is a village in the administrative district of Gmina Kcynia, within Nakło County, Kuyavian-Pomeranian Voivodeship, in north-central Poland.

Four Polish citizens were murdered by Nazi Germany in the village during World War II.

== Notable people ==
Kowalewko is the birthplace of Mieczysław Rakowski, the last First Secretary of the Polish United Workers' Party and former Prime Minister of Poland from 1988 to 1989.
