= Biking Across Kansas =

Annual recreational and social rally

Biking Across Kansas (BAK) is an annual recreational and social rally for bicyclists across the state of Kansas, United States.

The first Biking Across Kansas took place in June 1975 and has been held annually each year since. The route varies and has traversed all 105 counties of the state. More than 800 bicyclists from Kansas and other states participate each year. The event was founded and organized by Larry and Norma Christie from 1975 through 2001. Charlie Summers served as organizer in 2002 through 2012. In 2013, Biking Across Kansas became a 501c3 non-profit organization, overseen by a board of directors working with an executive director. Stefanie Weaver currently serves as executive director.

== 2023 BAK ==
BAK 2023: June 19-17, 2023. This 539-mile, eight-day tour begins at the Colorado border near Elkhart, Kansas and ends at the Missouri border near Pleasanton, Kansas. Overnight stops include Satanta, Spearville, Stafford, Newton, Eureka, Chanute, and Garnett.

== 2022 BAK ==
The 2022 BAK: June 10-18, 2022. A 512-mile, eight-day route from Syracuse, Kansas to Louisburg, Kansas. Overnight stops in Garden City, Spearville, St. John, Hutchinson, Hillsboro, Olpe, and Ottawa.

== 2021 BAK Rally ==
The 2021 BAK Rally: September 4-6, 2021. A 158-mile, three-day, hub-and-spoke tour based out of Great Bend, Kansas. Day 1: Santa Fe Trail Tour. Day 2: Arkansas Valley Ramble (with 100-mile option). Day 3: Ellinwood Loop.

== 2020 BAK ==
Canceled due to the pandemic.

== 2019 BAK ==
The 2019 BAK: June 8-15, 2019, with a 501-mile, eight-day route from Goodland, Kansas to Atchison, Kansas. Overnight stops in Colby, Hill City, Hays, Wilson, Minneapolis, Clay Center, and Holton.

== 2018 BAK ==
The 2018 BAK: June 9-16, 2018, with a 558-mile, eight-day route from Johnson City, Kansas to Fort Scott, Kansas. Overnight stops in Montezuma, Ashland, Pratt, Clearwater, Burden, Fredonia, and Arma.

== 2017 BAK ==
The 2017 BAK: June 10-17, 2017, with a 522-mile, eight-day route from Tribune, Kansas to Leavenworth, Kansas. Overnight stops in Dighton, WaKeeney, Plainville, Lincoln, Chapman, Rossville, and Tonganoxie.

== 2016 BAK ==
The 2016 BAK: June 4–11, 2016 with a 499-mile, eight-day route from Saint Francis to Elwood, with overnight stops in Oberlin, Phillipsburg, Mankato, Belleville, Marysville, Sabetha, and Troy.

== 2015 BAK ==
The 2015 BAK: June 6–13, 2015 with a 502-mile, eight-day route from Johnson City to Louisburg, with overnight stops in Lakin, Jetmore, Larned, Sterling, Goessel, Council Grove, and Baldwin City.

== 2014 BAK ==
The 2014 BAK: June 7–14, 2014 with a 555-mile, eight-day route from Elkhart to HIghland, with overnight stops in Satanta, Spearville, Ellinwood, Salina, Wamego, Oskaloosa, and Hiawatha.

== 2013 BAK ==
The 2013 BAK: June 8–15, 2013 with a 522-mile, eight-day route from Johnson City to Galena, with overnight stops in Sublette, Dodge City, Goldwater, Anthony, Arkansas City, Sedan, and Oswego.

== 2012 BAK ==
The 2012 BAK: June 9–16, 2012 with a 481-mile, eight-day route from Sharon Springs to Elwood, with overnight stops in Oakley, Hoxie, Logan, Downs, Clyde, Centralia, and Troy.

== 2011 BAK ==
The 2011 BAK: June 3–11, 2011 with a 474-mile, eight-day route from Tribune to La Cynge, with overnight stops in Scott City, Ness City, Hoisington, McPherson, Cottonwood Falls, Burlington, and Garnett.

== 2010 BAK ==
The 2009 BAK: June 5–12, 2010 with a 494-mile, eight-day route from Goodland in Western Kansas to Leavenworth, with overnight stops in Colby, Hill City, Osborne, Minneapolis, Herington, Osage City, and Eudora.

== 2009 BAK ==
The 2009 BAK: June 6–13, 2009 with a 540-mile, eight-day route from Syracuse in Western Kansas to Louisburg, with night stops in Garden City, Jetmore, St. John, Halstead, Eureka, Humboldt and Paola.

== 2008 BAK ==
The 2008 BAK: June 7–14, 2008 with a 466-mile, eight-day route from St. Francis in Western Kansas to Atchison, with night stops in Atwood, Norton, Smith Center, Beloit, Washington, Sabetha, and Horton.

== 2007 BAK ==
The 2007 BAK: June 9–16, 2007 with a 495-mile, eight-day route from Tribune in Western Kansas to Elwood, with night stops in Scott City, Ness City, Hoisington, Lincoln, Clay Center, Centralia, and Troy.

== 2006 BAK ==
The 2006 BAK was organized with a single 485-mile, eight-day route from Johnson City in Western Kansas to Mulberry, with night stops in Satanta, Ashland, Medicine Lodge, Clearwater, Burden, Neodesha, and Girard.

== 2005 BAK ==
The 2005 BAK was organized with a single 530-mile, eight-day route from Elkhart in the southwest corner of Kansas to White Cloud in the northeast, with night stops in Sublette, Spearville, Ellinwood, Lindsborg, Chapman, Onaga, and Hiawatha.

== Photos ==
- 2007 Photos by Paula V. Stout
- 2008 Photos by Paula V. Stout
