= Thomas H. Bak =

Polish-British cognitive neuroscientist (born 1961)

- Born: Tomasz Hieronymus Bąk; 27 March 1961 (age 65); Kraków, Poland
- Education: University of Freiburg
- Scientific career
- Fields: Cognitive neuroscience, Bilingualism and Neurodegenerative disorders
- Workplaces: University of Edinburgh School of Philosophy, Psychology and Language Sciences at University of Edinburgh

Thomas H. Bak (originally Tomasz Hieronymus Bąk; born 27 March 1961) is a Polish-British cognitive neuroscientist. He is a researcher at the University of Edinburgh whose work centres on the impact of bilingualism on cognitive functions, bilingualism and cognitive function across the lifespan, cross-linguistic studies of aphasia, and the relationship between language, cognition and culture in neurodegenerative brain diseases. He also works on the design and adaptation of cognitive and motor assessments to different languages and cultures.

== Early life ==
Thomas H Bak was born in Kraków, Poland. He studied medicine in the University of Hamburg and obtained his doctorate from the University of Freiburg in Breisgau (Germany).

== Research and career ==
Thomas Bak joined the cognitive neurology research group at the MRC Cognition and Brain Sciences Unit in Cambridge in 1995.His area of specialisation was interaction between motor and cognitive functions (including language and memory). He established a clinic for the disorders of movement and cognition in Cambridge in 1996.

Since 2006 he has been working in the Department of Psychology, the Centre for Clinical Brain Sciences and the Centre for Cognitive Aging and Cognitive Epidemiology at the University of Edinburgh. In 2008 he established the Edinburgh Interdisciplinary Seminars in Philosophy, Psychology and Language Sciences.

He was the president of the World Federation of Neurology Research Group on Aphasia, Dementia and Cognitive Disorders (2010–2016).

He is best known for his work on the impact of bilingualism on cognitive ageing, in particular the finding that in people who speak two languages (whether from childhood or acquired later in life), dementia is delayed.

== Selected publications ==
- Bak TH, O'Donovan DG, Xuereb JH, Boniface S, Hodges JR (January 2001). "Selective impairment of verb processing associated with pathological changes in Brodmann areas 44 and 45 in the motor neurone disease-dementia-aphasia syndrome". Brain. 124 (Pt 1): 103–20. doi:10.1093/brain/124.1.103. PMID 11133791.
- Bak TH, Hodges JR (April 2001). "Motor neurone disease, dementia and aphasia: coincidence, co-occurrence or continuum?". Journal of Neurology. 248 (4): 260–70. doi:10.1007/s004150170199. PMID 11374089. S2CID 12958139.
- Bak TH, Yancopoulou D, Nestor PJ, Xuereb JH, Spillantini MG, Pulvermüller F, Hodges JR (February 2006). "Clinical, imaging and pathological correlates of a hereditary deficit in verb and action processing". Brain. 129 (Pt 2): 321–32. doi:10.1093/brain/awh701. PMID 16330501.
- Bak TH, Chandran S (July 2012). "What wires together dies together: verbs, actions and neurodegeneration in motor neuron disease". Cortex; A Journal Devoted to the Study of the Nervous System and Behavior. 48 (7): 936–44. doi:10.1016/j.cortex.2011.07.008. PMID 21924711. S2CID 10459081.
- Bak TH, Nissan JJ, Allerhand MM, Deary IJ (June 2014). "Does bilingualism influence cognitive aging?". Annals of Neurology. 75 (6): 959–63. doi:10.1002/ana.24158. PMC 4320748. PMID 24890334.
- Bak TH, Long MR, Vega-Mendoza M, Sorace A (2016). "Novelty, Challenge, and Practice: The Impact of Intensive Language Learning on Attentional Functions". PLOS One. 11 (4) e0153485. Bibcode:2016PLoSO..1153485B. doi:10.1371/journal.pone.0153485. PMC 4847793. PMID 27120179.
