= Kcynia =

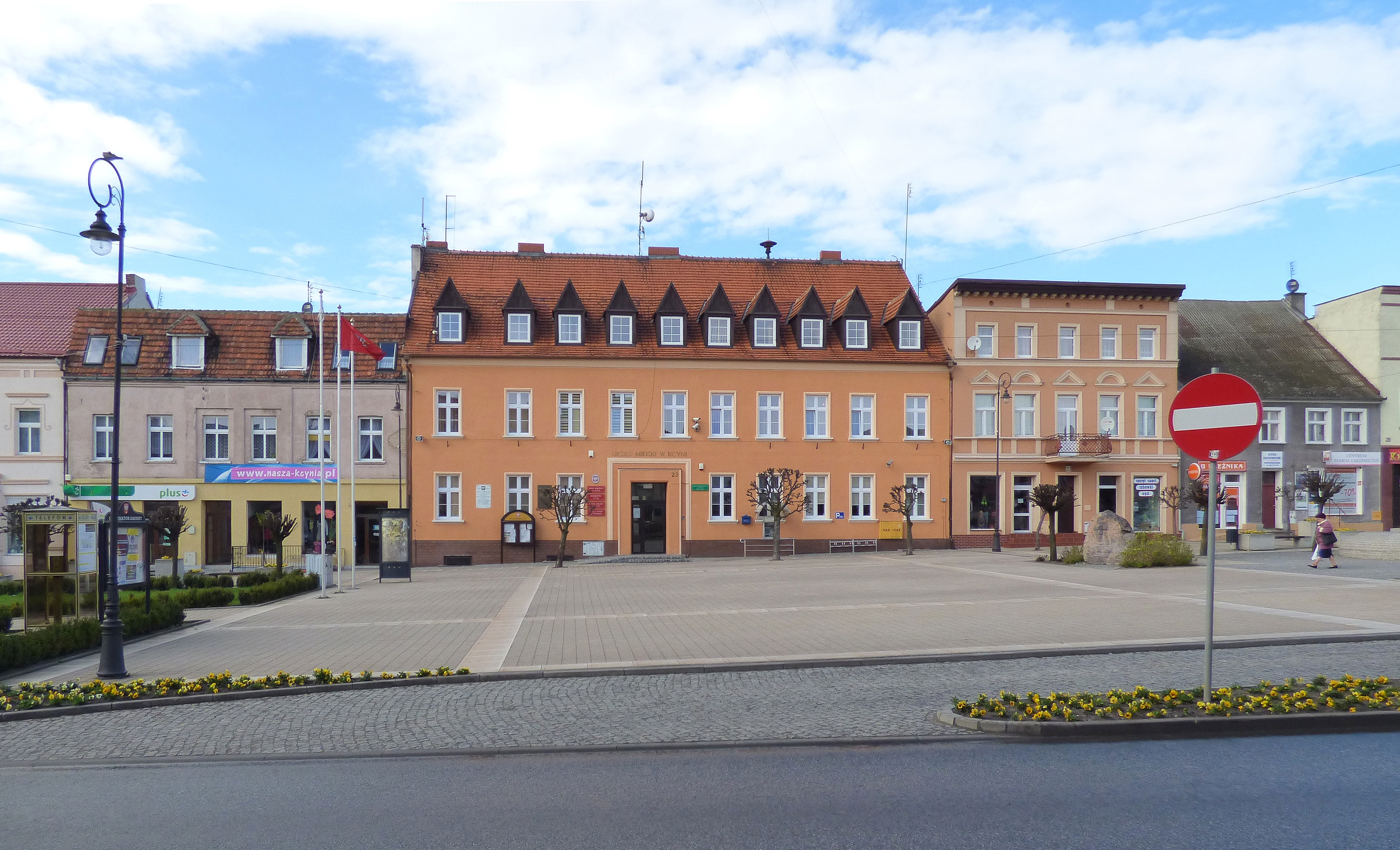
- Marketplace and Town Hall

- Flag Coat of arms

- Location within Poland
- Coordinates: 52°59′31″N 17°29′4″E
- Country: Poland
- Voivodeship: Kuyavian-Pomeranian
- County: Nakło
- Gmina: Kcynia

Area
  - Total: 6.84 km^{2} (2.64 sq mi)

Population (2010)
  - Total: 4,702
  - Density: 687/km^{2} (1,780/sq mi)
- Time zone: UTC+1 (CET)
  - Summer (DST): UTC+2 (CEST)
- Postal code: 89-240
- Website: http://www.kcynia.pl

Kcynia [ˈkt͡sɨɲa] is a town in Nakło County, Kuyavian-Pomeranian Voivodeship, in north-central Poland, with 4,702 inhabitants (2010). It is located in the Pałuki ethnographic region in the northern part of historic Greater Poland.

== History ==
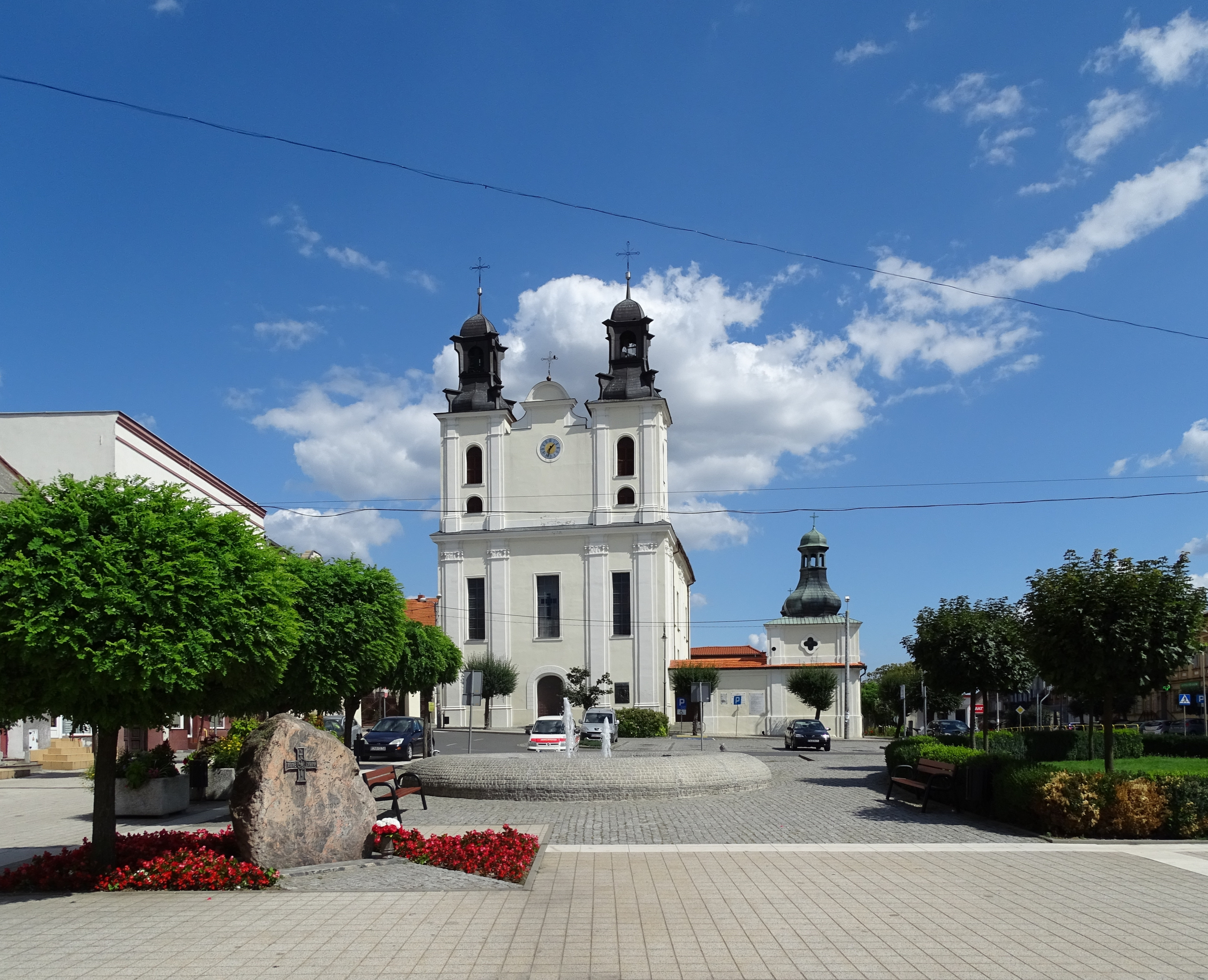
Baroque Church of the Assumption of Mary seen from the Rynek (Market Square)

Kcynia started in the Middle Ages, with the rule of the founding Piast dynasty in Poland. In the 11th century, Polish ruler Władysław Herman built a church of St. Giles at the site. In 1255 Kcynia was owned by Duke of Greater Poland Przemysł I. His brother, Duke Bolesław the Pious, in 1262 granted Kcynia town rights along with privileges similar to those enjoyed by Poznań and Gniezno. Kcynia was a royal town of the Polish Crown and a county seat in the Kalisz Voivodeship in the Greater Poland Province. The coat of arms of Kcynia depicts the white eagle of Greater Poland. Kcynia suffered a fire in 1441. The town had defensive walls and a castle, which was the seat of local starosts (local royal administrators). In 1594 Polish King Sigismund III Vasa visited the town, while returning from Sweden. From 1768 Kcynia was part of the newly established Gniezno Voivodeship in the Greater Poland Province.

Kcynia was annexed by Prussia in the First Partition of Poland in 1772. In 1807 it became part of the short-lived Polish Duchy of Warsaw, and in 1815 it was re-annexed by Prussia. During the Greater Poland uprising (1848), it was the site of the Battle of Kcynia, in which Polish insurgents won against the Prussians. The town was attacked on the night of May 7, 1848, led by several Polish nobles. On this occasion around 40 people lost their lives, the town was set on fire in three places, and the German inhabitants were plundered under the pretext of disarmament. In 1867 a post office building was built. In 1871, the town became part of the German Empire, as part of the Prussian Province of Posen. In 1888 Kcynia, then officially Exin, was connected to the rail network from Gnesen (Gniezno) to Nakel (Nakło nad Notecią). Similar to the Września children strike, there was a strike in the school year 1906/1907 when German was introduced as a compulsory language for religious instruction. In 1908 the rail network was expanded and the city received rail connections to Bromberg (Bydgoszcz) and Posen (Poznań). In 1913 the construction of the station building was completed.

Historical population
Year	Pop.	±%
1890	2,814	—
1921	3,369	+19.7%
1931	4,391	+30.3%
1938	4,554	+3.7%
2010	4,702	+3.2%

According to the German census of 1890, the town had a population of 2,814, of which 1,650 (58.6%) were Poles. In 1913, the town had a population of 4,000, including 3,000 Roman Catholics, 800 Protestants, and 200 Jews. The populace took part in the Greater Poland uprising (1918–19), and the town was restored to the newly reborn Second Polish Republic in 1919, confirmed officially on January 10, 1920 in the Treaty of Versailles. Many German and Jewish inhabitants left the town in the interwar period. In the 1938 Polish census, of the 4,554 inhabitants, 4,159 were Polish, 327 declared German ethnicity and only 68 were Jewish.

During World War II, Kcynia was under German occupation from 1939 to 1945. The Germans carried out massacres and expulsions of Poles to the General Government in the more eastern part of German-occupied Poland. In December 1939 and August 1940, Germans expelled Polish intelligentsia with their families, as well as owners of better houses, workshops and shops, which were then handed over to German colonists as part of the Lebensraum policy. Further expulsions were carried out in February 1941. In 1939, the Jewish synagogue was destroyed by the Wehrmacht. The Polish resistance movement was active in Kcynia, including a local unit of the Wielkopolska Organizacja Wojskowa, later merged into the Wojskowa Organizacja Ziem Zachodnich.

== Sights ==
The main landmarks of Kcynia are the Carmelite monastery with the Baroque Church of the Assumption of Mary, and the Gothic Saint Michael Archangel church.

== Notable residents ==
- Bernadetta Blechacz (1955- ), Polish Olympian javelin thrower
- Ismar Isidor Boas (1858-1938), German-Jewish gastroenterologist
- Jan Czochralski (1885-1953), Polish chemist
- Otto Krümmel (1854-1912), German geographer
- Klara Prillowa (1907-1991), Polish sculptor, folklorist and ethnographer
- Mieczysław Rakowski (1926-2008), Polish communist politician and Prime Minister
