= Dobieszewo, Kuyavian-Pomeranian Voivodeship =

Dobieszewo
- Village
- Location within Poland
- Coordinates: 52°59′53″N 17°19′51″E
- Country: Poland
- Voivodeship: Kuyavian-Pomeranian
- County: Nakło
- Gmina: Kcynia

Dobieszewo [dɔbjɛˈʂɛvɔ] is a village in the administrative district of Gmina Kcynia, within Nakło County, Kuyavian-Pomeranian Voivodeship, in north-central Poland.
