= Bąk, Kuyavian-Pomeranian Voivodeship =

Bąk
- Village
- Location within Poland
- Coordinates: 53°0′57″N 17°32′2″E
- Country: Poland
- Voivodeship: Kuyavian-Pomeranian
- County: Nakło
- Gmina: Kcynia

Bąk [bɔŋk] is a village in the administrative district of Gmina Kcynia, within Nakło County, Kuyavian-Pomeranian Voivodeship, in north-central Poland.
