= Bąk (surname) =

Polish surname

Bąk (Polish pronunciation: [ˈbɔŋk]) is a Polish surname. It is sometimes written as Bonk due to its pronunciation. In Polish, the word has several meanings, including Botaurus (a genus of birds in the heron family), horse-fly, child, and bumblebee.

== People ==
- Agnieszka Dziemianowicz-Bąk (born 1984), Polish politician
- Arkadiusz Bąk (born 1974), Polish footballer
- Bożena Bąk (born 1966), Polish badminton player
- Henryk Bąk (1923–1987), Polish actor
- Ignacy Bąk (born 1995), Polish handball player
- Jacek Bąk (born 1973), Polish footballer
- Jacek Bąk (footballer, born 1962), Polish footballer
- Jakub Bąk (born 1993), Polish footballer
- Justyna Bąk (born 1974), Polish long-distance runner
- Krystian Bąk (born 1956), Polish field hockey player
- Krzysztof Bąk (born 1982), Polish footballer
- Mateusz Bąk (1983–2026), Polish footballer
- Mirosław Bąk (born 1961), Polish footballer
- Thomas Bak (born 1978), Polish-born German artist
